= Tyrolean campaign order of battle =

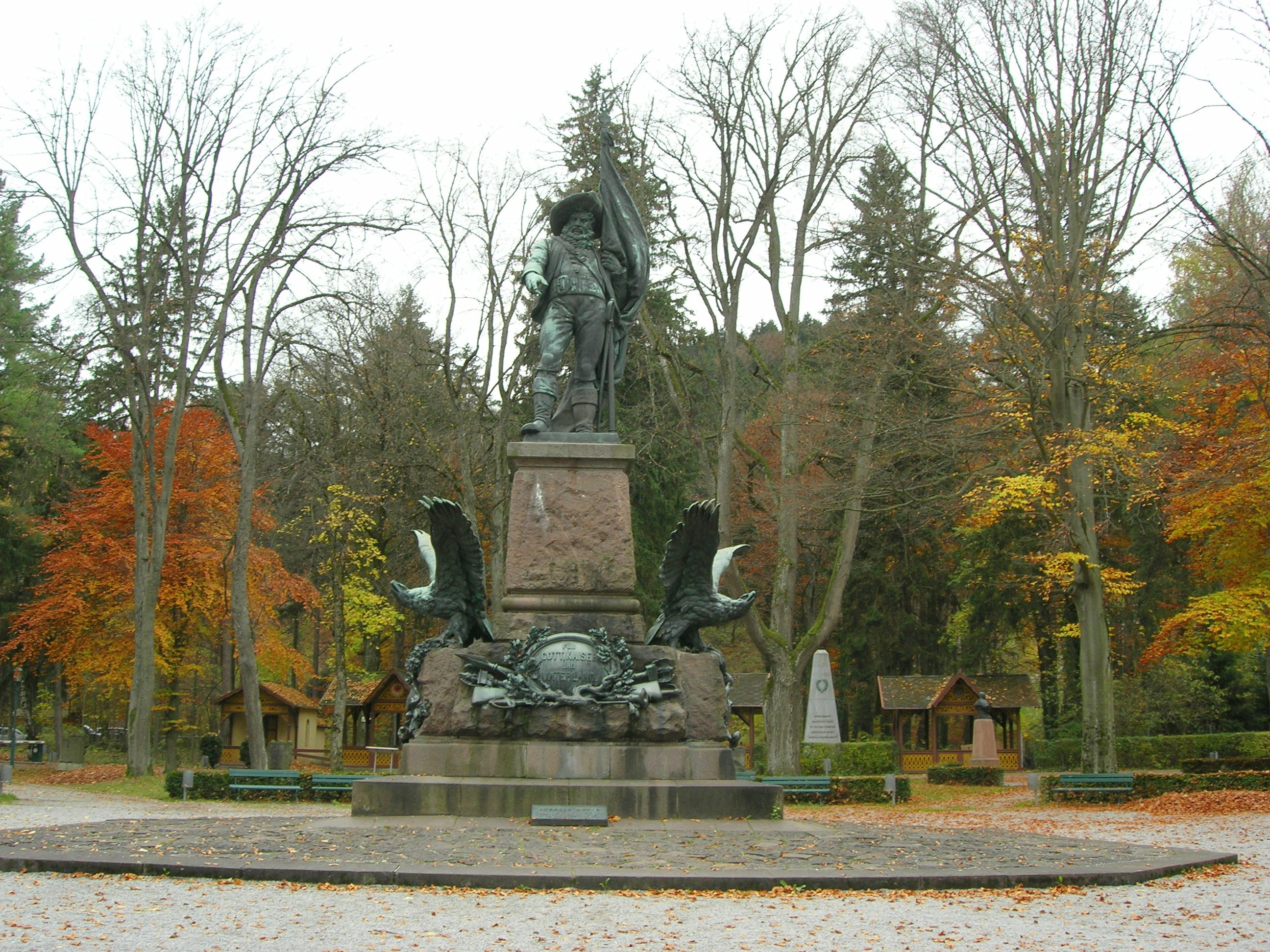
Andreas Hofer statue near the Bergisel

At the beginning of the War of the Fifth Coalition on 9 April 1809, the armies of the Austrian Empire invaded the Kingdom of Bavaria, an ally of the First French Empire, and the Kingdom of Italy, a French satellite. After Austria's defeat in the War of the Third Coalition the County of Tyrol and the Vorarlberg were ceded to Bavaria in the Fourth Peace of Pressburg on 26 December 1805. Angry at the imposition of Bavarian laws and conscription, the Tyrolese rebelled in support of Austria. During the first week, local irregular forces killed or captured the main Bavarian garrison and also forced a French force to capitulate.

To assist the Tyrolean Rebellion, the Austrian high command sent a regular division into the Tyrol under the leadership of Feldmarschallleutnant Johann Gabriel Chasteler de Courcelles. The VII Corps, consisting of three Bavarian divisions under the overall command of Marshal François Joseph Lefebvre, invaded the Tyrol in mid-May. On 11 May, Lieutenant General Bernhard Erasmus von Deroy relieved the besieged Kufstein Fortress. Lieutenant General Karl Philipp von Wrede crushed Chasteler's division on 13 May at the Battle of Wörgl. Soon afterward, Lefebvre occupied Innsbruck. However, Deroy's division was attacked on 25 May and 29 May in the first two Battles of Bergisel and compelled to evacuate the Tyrol. By this time Chasteler's surviving regular troops were recalled to join the Army of Inner Austria, which was retreating toward Hungary. Only a handful of regulars were left to operate in the Tyrol.

Soon after Emperor Napoleon I of France defeated the main Austrian army at the Battle of Wagram on 5 and 6 July, Austria sued for peace. However, the revolt in the Tyrol continued and the Bavarians invaded the region a second time in late July. After the insurgents beat Deroy at the Third Battle of Bergisel on 13 August, the Bavarians again withdrew. In the third invasion, the Bavarian 1st Division under General-Major Rechberg inflicted a bloody defeat on the irregulars on 17 October. Wrede won the Fourth Battle of Bergisel on 1 November and the revolt finally died down. One of the leaders of the rebellion, Andreas Hofer was betrayed to the French and executed in February 1810.

== Order of battle ==
=== Austrian Tyrol force ===
Chastler's original force was organized as follows.

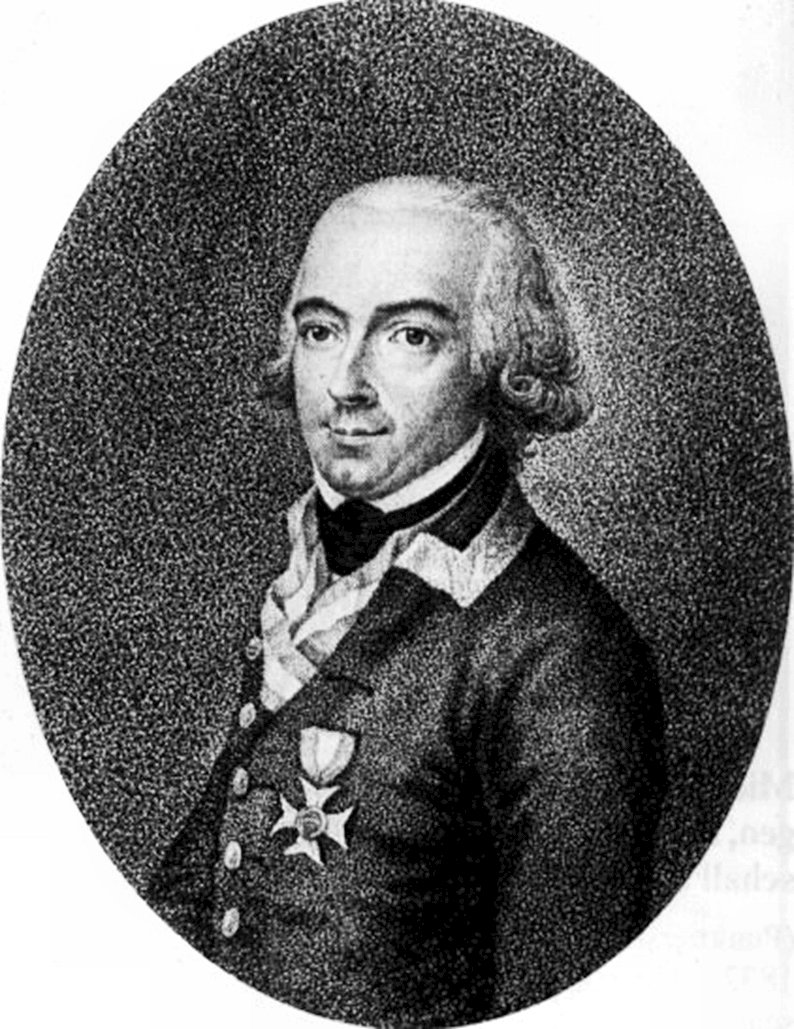
Johann Chasteler

- Tyrol Detachment: Feldmarschallleutnant Johann Gabriel Chasteler de Courcelles
  - 1st Brigade: General-Major Ignaz Peter Marchal
    - Hohenlohe-Bartenstein Infantry Regiment # 26 (3 battalions)
    - Lusignan Infantry Regiment # 16 (3 battalions)
    - Hohenzollern Chevau-léger Regiment # 2 (3 squadrons)
  - 2nd Brigade: General-Major Franz Fenner
    - Jäger battalion # 9
    - Villach, Klagenfurt, and Bruck Landwehr battalions
  - Artillery:
    - One 3-pdr brigade battery (8 guns)
    - One 6-pdr position battery (6 guns)
    - One-half horse battery (3 guns)

=== Bavarian forces ===
Returns from 16 April

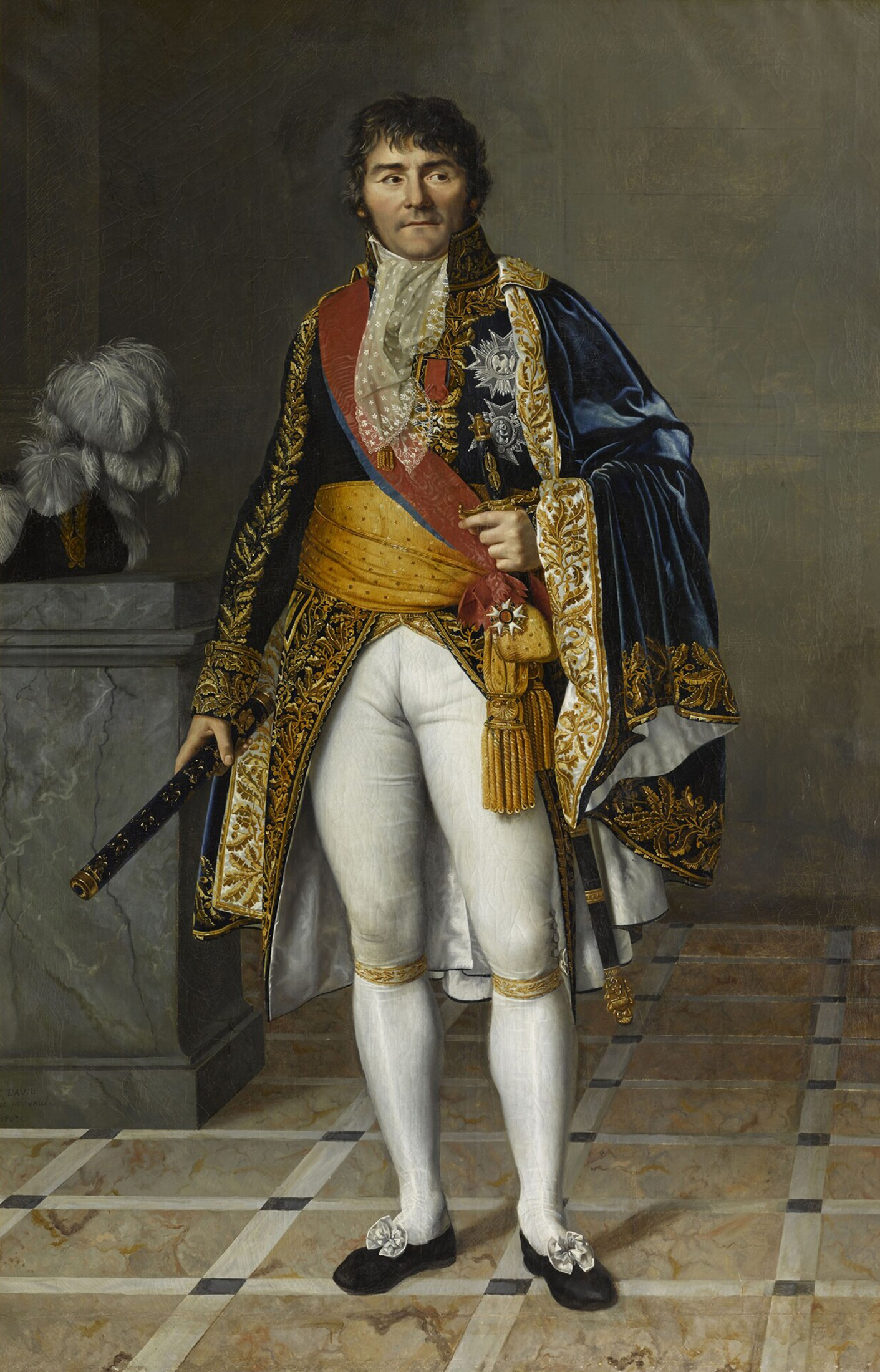
François Lefebvre

VII Corps: Marshal François Joseph Lefebvre

- Artillery Reserve: Colonel Calonge
  - Three 12-pdr position batteries (18 guns)
- 1st Bavarian Division: Lieutenant-General Crown Prince Ludwig of Bavaria
  - Brigade: General-Major Rechberg
    - 1st Habermann Light battalion
    - Leib Regiment (2 battalions)
    - 2nd Prince Royal Regiment (2 battalions)
  - Brigade: General-Major Stengel
    - 4th Salern Regiment (2 battalions)
    - 8th Duc Pius Regiment (2 battalions)
  - Cavalry Brigade: General-Major Zandt
    - Minuzzi Dragoon Regiment (2 squadrons)
    - Prince Royal Chevau-léger Regiment (4 squadrons)
  - Artillery: Two 6-pdr foot batteries, 6-pdr horse battery (18 guns)

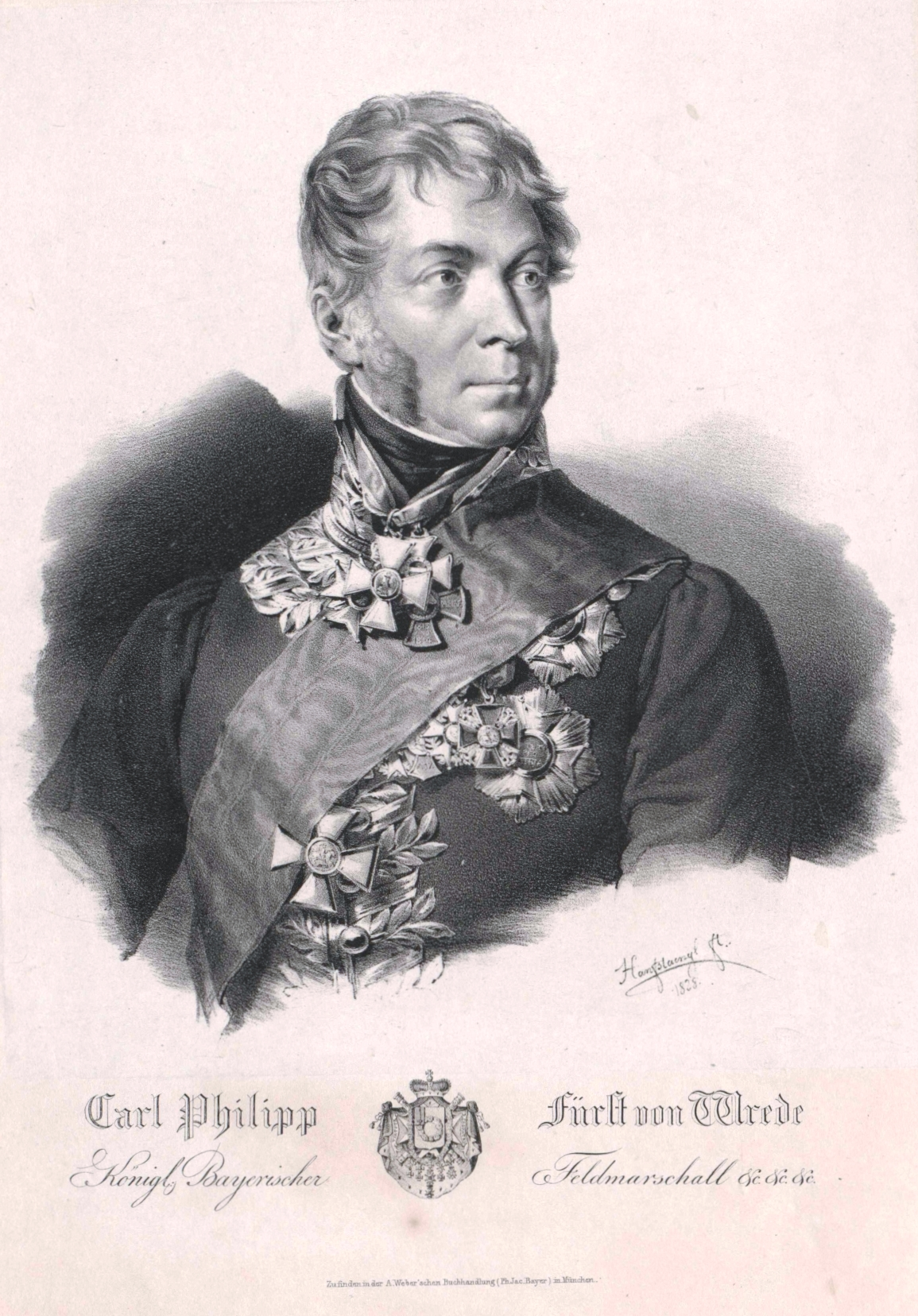
Karl von Wrede

- 2nd Bavarian Division: Lieutenant-General Karl Philipp von Wrede
  - Brigade: General-Major Minuzzi
    - 6th Laroche Light battalion
    - 3rd Prince Karl Regiment (2 battalions)
    - 13th Regiment (2 battalions)
  - Brigade: General-Major Beckers
    - 6th Duc Wilhelm Regiment (2 battalions)
    - 7th Löwenstein Regiment (2 battalions)
  - Cavalry Brigade: General-Major Preysing
    - König Chevau-léger Regiment (4 squadrons)
    - Leiningen Chevau-léger Regiment (4 squadrons)
  - Artillery: Two 6-pdr foot batteries, 6-pdr horse battery (18 guns)

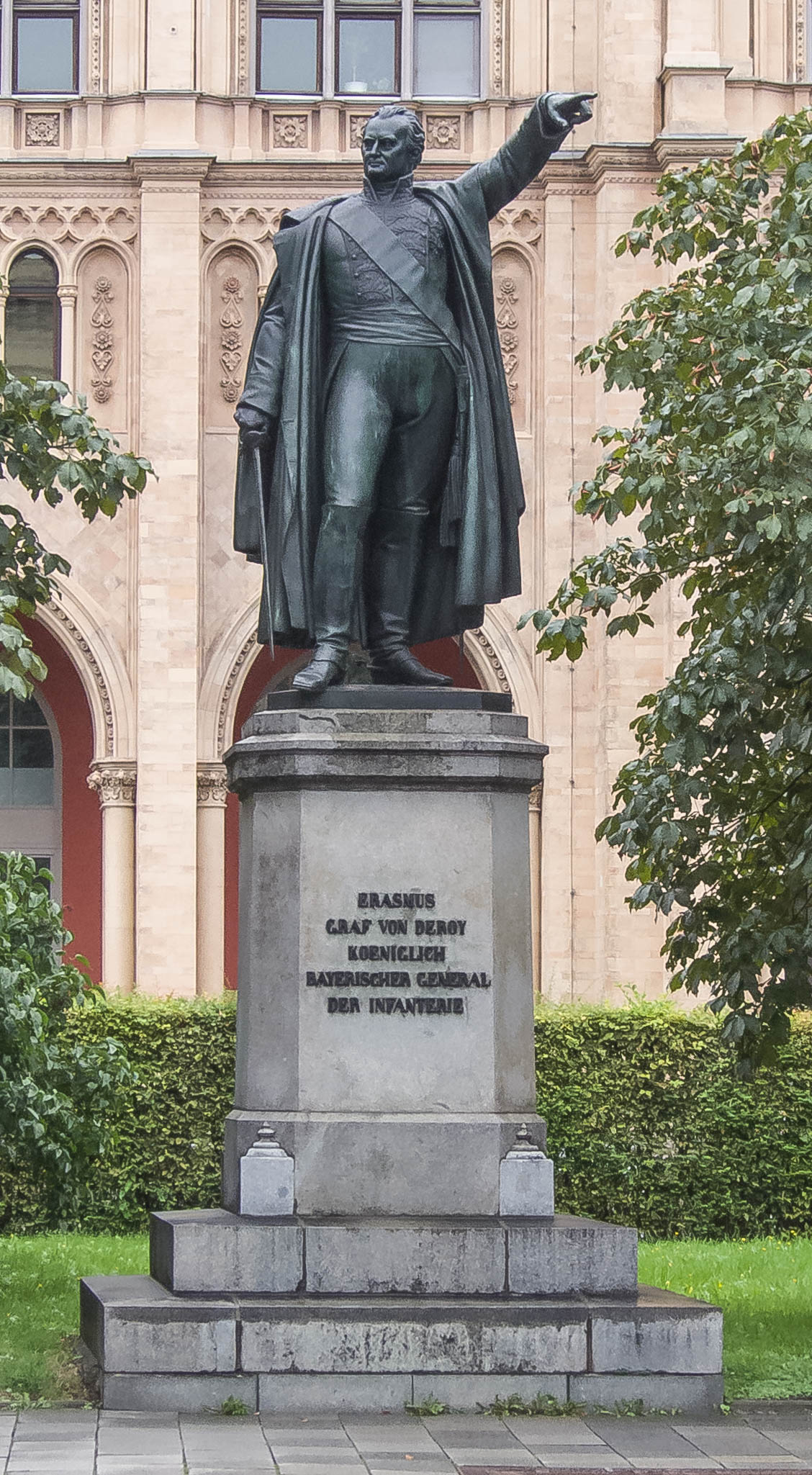
Bernhard von Deroy

- 3rd Bavarian Division: Lieutenant-General Bernhard Erasmus von Deroy
  - Brigade: General-Major Siebein
    - 5th Buttler Light battalion
    - 9th Isenburg Regiment (2 battalions)
    - 10th Juncker Regiment (2 battalions)
  - Brigade: General-Major Vincenti
    - 7th Günter Light battalion
    - 5th Regiment (2 battalions)
    - 14th Preysing Regiment (2 battalions)
  - Cavalry Brigade: General-Major Seydewitz
    - Taxis Dragoon Regiment (4 squadrons)
    - Bubenhoven Chevau-léger Regiment (4 squadrons)
  - Artillery: Two 6-pdr foot batteries, 6-pdr horse battery (18 guns)
