= Bernhard Erasmus von Deroy =

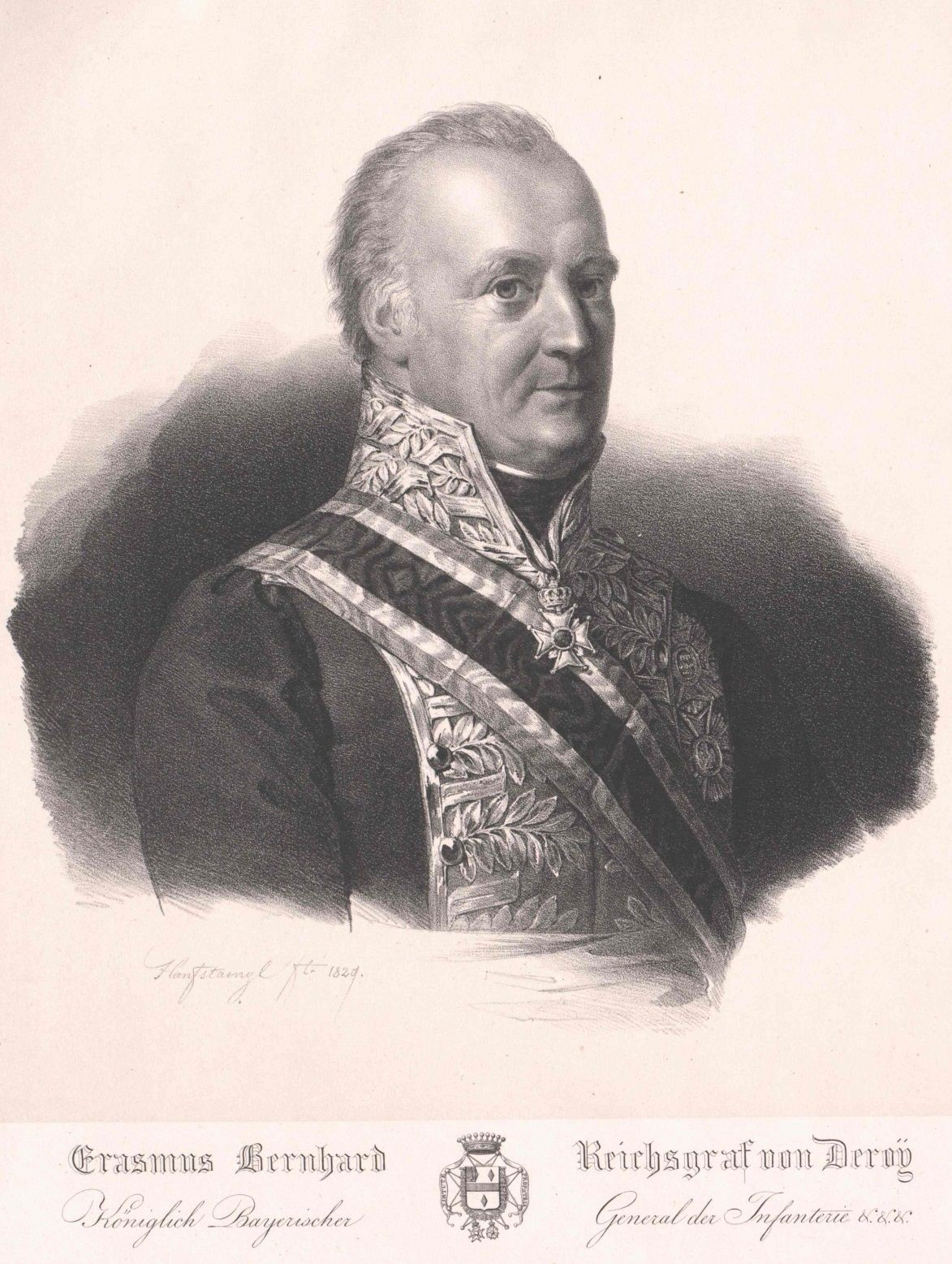
- Bernhard Erasmus von Deroy
- Born: 11 December 1743; Mannheim, modern-day Germany
- Died: 23 August 1812 (aged 68); Polotsk, modern-day Belarus
- Military career
- Allegiance: Kingdom of Bavaria
- Branch: Infantry
- Rank: General of the Infantry
- Conflicts: Seven Years' War; French Revolutionary Wars; Napoleonic Wars
- Awards: Military Order of Max Joseph, GC 1806; Legion d'Honneur, 1804

Bernhard Erasmus von Deroy (11 December 1743 – 23 August 1812) from the Electorate of the Palatinate became a general officer in the army of Bavaria. His military career began shortly after the start of the Seven Years' War. During the French Revolutionary Wars he first served on the side of the Coalition against the French revolutionaries, then fought as an ally of the First French Empire during the Napoleonic Wars. Deroy and his colleague, Karl Philipp von Wrede, were dominant personalities in the Bavarian military during the era of Napoleon Bonaparte.

From a military family, Deroy entered the army as a junior officer at an early age. He rose in rank to become a general by the time the War of the First Coalition broke out. He defended his home city of Mannheim against the army of the French First Republic until its capture in 1795. In 1800, he again fought as an ally of Austria, leading a brigade of Bavarian troops in action. From the time Napoleon became the emperor of France, Bavaria became allied to France and Deroy capably led a division during the 1805, 1806–1807, 1809, and 1812 wars. He was mortally wounded in 1812 during Napoleon's campaign in Russia.

== Early career ==
Born in Mannheim on 11 December 1743, Bernhard Erasmus von Deroy's parents were General Matthias Bertram de Roy and Elizabeth Christine of Hofstatt. He was appointed ensign in the Count Palatine Karl August Infantry Regiment at a very young age and fought in the Battle of Hastenbeck on 27 June 1757. He became a lieutenant on 14 February 1761 and captain of an infantry company on 5 September 1763. His next promotion occurred on 30 October 1775 when he became a major in the Duke of Zweibrücken Infantry Regiment. He was elevated in rank to Oberstleutnant while belonging to the Rodenhausen Infantry Regiment on 8 June 1784. On 21 December 1787 he returned to the Duke of Zweibrücken as Oberst and commanding officer. On 3 November 1792, Deroy was promoted to General-Feldwachtmeister and later appointed governor of Mannheim. In this position he became responsible for strengthening the fortifications in anticipation of a French attack.

== French Revolutionary Wars ==
On 23 and 24 December, Deroy fought in the bridgehead of Mannheim, which had come under attack. On 25 December the bridgehead fell to the French and four Austrian battalions became prisoners. The fortress came under siege the following year and Lieutenant General Baron von Belderbusch capitulated on 20 September 1795. The French captured the 9,200-man garrison and 471 guns, of which all were Bavarians except one Austrian battalion. Deroy left the city on 22 September after agreeing not to serve in the war against France.

The War of the Second Coalition broke out in 1799 and in the spring of 1800, Lieutenant General Christian Zweibrücken appointed Deroy to lead the 6,000-strong 1st Brigade as part of a German auxiliary corps allied with the Austrians. Deroy's command included the following battalions, Reuss Grenadiers, Elector of Bavaria, Morawitzky, Herzog Wilhelm, Schlossberg, plus a company of sharpshooters, three squadrons of Chevau-légers, a battery of foot artillery and a battery of horse artillery. On 12 May, the 2nd Brigade led by Karl Philipp von Wrede joined the corps. He fought at the Battle of the Iller River on 5 June and at the Battle of Neuburg an der Donau on 27 June.

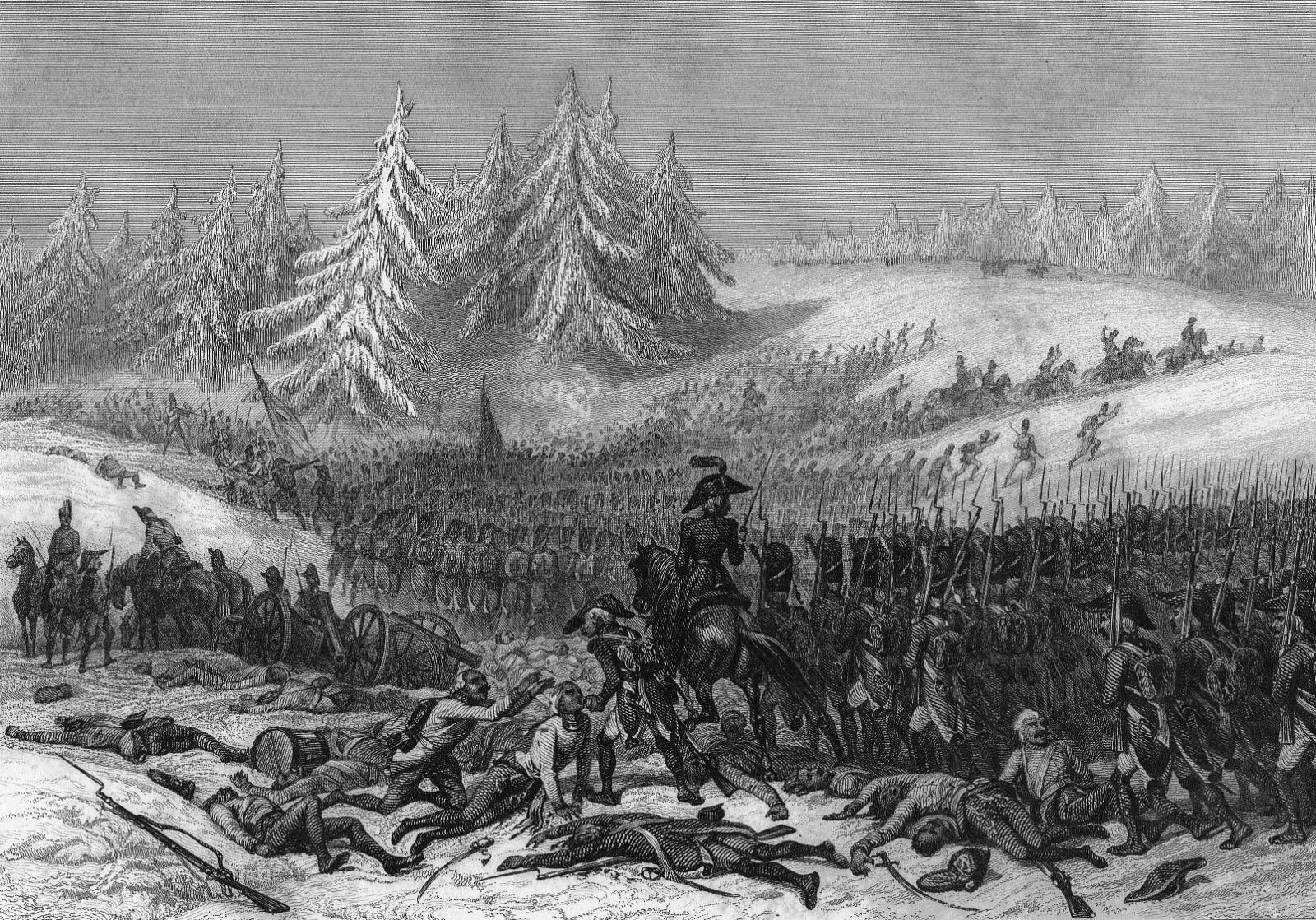
Deroy was captured by the French at the Battle of Hohenlinden

The series of Austrian defeats was ended by a truce on 15 July 1800. The armistice concluded in late November at which time the youthful and inexperienced Austrian commander Archduke John of Austria assembled 15,762 Bavarians and Württembergers behind the Inn River west of Braunau am Inn. John's 65,500-man main body lay just to the east. In Zweibrücken's Bavarian Division, Deroy led the Reuss Grenadiers, Metzen Light, Schlossburg, Stengel, and Minucci infantry battalions. With Wrede's brigade, the Bavarian contingent numbered 7,017 infantry, 828 cavalry, and 26 artillery pieces.

In the Battle of Hohenlinden on 3 December 1800, the Bavarians marched with the Left Center Column, which was under the command of Johann Kollowrat and accompanied by Archduke John. Early in the morning, Kollowrat drove back the French 108th Line Infantry Demi-Brigade. To keep the attack rolling, the Austrian committed three of Deroy's battalions. However, the allies soon ran into Emmanuel Grouchy's main line of resistance and were driven back by a powerful counterattack. Zweibrücken also sent two Bavarian battalions searching for Johann Sigismund Riesch's tardy Left Column to the south. Instead of Riesch, Antoine Richepanse's French division emerged from the forests to Kollowrat's left rear. After heavy fighting, Kollowrat's column was caught in a three-sided trap between the divisions of Richepanse, Grouchy, and Michel Ney. In the disaster that followed, Deroy and 18 other Bavarian officers became prisoners of war along with thousands of Austrian and Bavarian rank and file. Zweibrücken had to catch an artillery horse in order to get away and even the archduke had a narrow escape.

== Napoleonic Wars ==
=== 1805–1807 ===
Military Order of Max Joseph

In 1801 Elector Maximilian IV Joseph of Bavaria named Deroy to a commission to improve and reorganize the army. He led a brigade at Landshut in 1803, and in the following year he and Wrede introduced the new military regulations. On 21 April 1804, Deroy received promotion to Lieutenant General and was decorated with military awards. Napoleon awarded him the Grand Eagle of the Legion d'Honneur.

The latter award was possible because Bavaria became a secret ally of France against Austria. When the War of the Third Coalition broke out in September 1805, the Bavarian army withdrew north to the Main River in response to the Austrian invasion. Deroy commanded a corps of two divisions, including his own and Wrede's. The French armies soon obliterated the Austrian army of Karl Mack von Lieberich at the Battle of Ulm on 20 October. This freed the Bavarian contingent to operate against the Tyrol. On 1 November, Bavarian Oberst Pompei successfully rushed several positions near Lofer which lies southwest of Salzburg. Encouraged, Deroy ordered an attack on the Strub Pass, eight kilometers west of Lofer. The position was defended by Franz Xaver Saint-Julien's 1,500-man Austrian brigade with the support of local Tyrolean militia and sharpshooters. The assault ended in a bloody repulse, with 1,200 to 1,800 Bavarians out as casualties, including Deroy wounded. Saint-Julien only lost 200 men and one cannon.

On 1 March 1806, Deroy received the Grand Cross of the Military Order of Max Joseph. In the War of the Fourth Coalition, Deroy was placed under the command of Prince Jerome Bonaparte. He undertook several sieges of Prussian fortresses in Silesia during 1806 and 1807. In November 1806, Deroy's 1st Bavarian Division laid siege to the fortress of Głowgów (Glogau). After the Bavarians were replaced by a Württemberg division, the place surrendered on 2 December. He marched to Wrocław (Breslau) where his division arrived on 18 December. Prince Jerome's 22,000-strong IX Corps maintained the siege until 6 January 1807 when the fortress capitulated with 5,300 prisoners and 268 cannon. Bavarian casualties numbered 259 in the operation. Deroy then advanced with 13,000 troops to lay siege to Brzeg (Brieg). On 17 January Brzeg surrendered with 1,450 prisoners.

Deroy placed Koźle (Kosel) under siege on 24 January, but the place resisted all attempts at capture. On 2 July, the Bavarians abandoned the effort. Now under the command of Dominique Vandamme, Deroy participated in the storm and capture of Kłodzko (Glatz) on 24 June 1807. He moved against Srebrna Góra (Silberburg) with 6,500 troops, but the Prussian garrison refused to give up after he bombarded the fortress on 28 and 29 June. The Peace of Tilsit ended the fighting. On 27 November, he was named to the Privy Council of Bavaria.

=== 1809 and 1812 ===
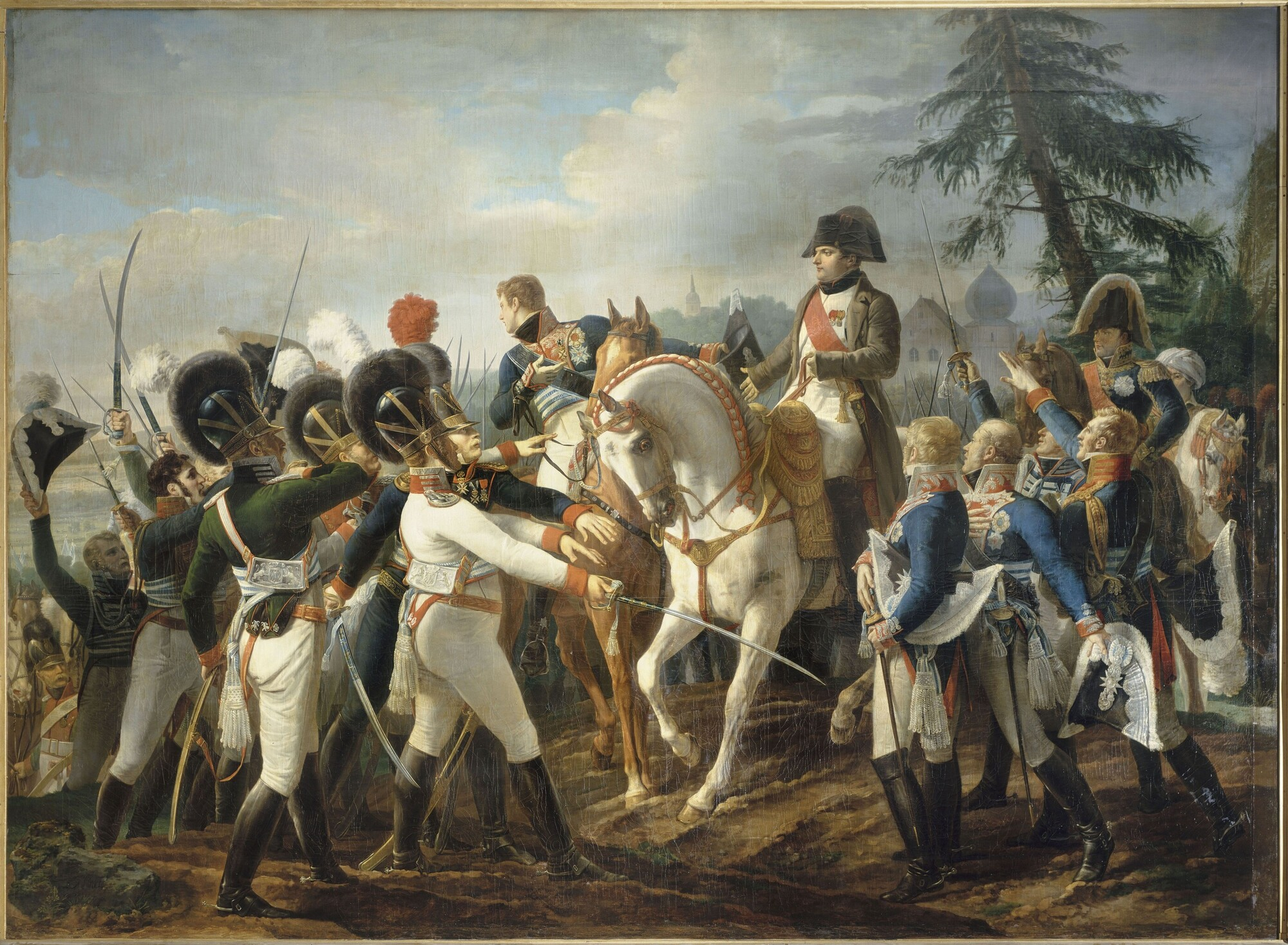
Napoleon addressing Bavarian soldiers

At the beginning of the War of the Fifth Coalition, Deroy relinquished command of the 1st Division to Crown Prince Ludwig of Bavaria and took charge of the 3rd Division in the VII Corps. This unit consisted of the 5th, 9th, 10th, and 14th Infantry Regiments, the 5th and 7th Light Battalions, the Taxis Dragoons and Bubenhoven Chevau-légers, and 18 pieces of artillery. After the Austrian invasion, Deroy held the west bank of the Isar River opposite Landshut on 16 April 1809. In a brief action, each side lost 150 to 200 killed and wounded. After an Austrian column crossed upstream at Moosburg, he fell back through Pfeffenhausen to Siegenburg. Under the command of Marshal François Joseph Lefebvre, Deroy was present but not engaged in the Battle of Abensberg on 20 April.

On 21 April, as Napoleon was winning the Battle of Landshut to the south, Deroy fought against Prince Franz Seraph of Rosenberg-Orsini's Austrian IV Armeekorps. He advanced on the right flank of Louis Davout's French III Corps and captured the village of Schierling. The Bavarians got no farther that day and Davout's attacks were also stopped. Bavarian losses were about 150 and French casualties 1,500, while the Austrians lost 3,000.

In the Battle of Eckmühl on 22 April, Davout and Deroy advanced from the west, while Napoleon fell on Rosenberg's position from the south. The Austrians held a key position called the Bettel Berg with 3,000 infantry and 16 cannons. Deroy's cavalry brigade under General-Major Seydewitz attacked first and was driven back by well-handled Austrian light cavalry. Deroy's infantry tried next. Raked by accurate artillery fire and counterattacked by cavalry, they too were defeated. Later in the day, three squadrons of Bavarian cavalry charged again and were mowed down by artillery fire. But as the survivors fell back from the deadly guns, a mass formation of French cuirassiers trotted forward. The heavy cavalrymen swept aside a last despairing Austrian cavalry charge and overran the Bettel Berg. Elements of Deroy's cavalry brigade participated in the famous moonlight cavalry action at Alteglofsheim that night.

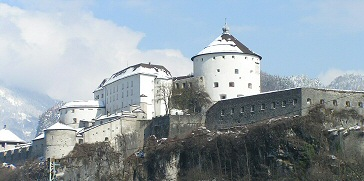
Deroy relieved Kufstein fortress on 11 May 1809.

After Eckmühl and the minor Battle of Neumarkt-Sankt Veit on 24 April, Napoleon urged Lefebvre to seize Salzburg and relieve the Bavarian garrison of the Kufstein Fortress. In early May, Austrians and Tyrolean irregulars defeated General-Major Vincenti's brigade of the 3rd Division in its attempt to reach Kufstein. At this, Napoleon demanded that Lefebvre mount a full-scale relief operation. On 11 May, Deroy relieved the 576-man garrison, which had held out for a month. With Wrede's and Deroy's divisions, Lefebvre routed Johann Gabriel Chasteler de Courcelles at the Battle of Wörgl on 13 May. Chasteler, who had been supporting the Tyrolean Rebellion, was soon after ordered to abandon the area.

Innsbruck was occupied but Deroy's 3rd Division came under attack in the first of the Battles of Bergisel on 25 May 1809. Out of 4,000 soldiers and 12 guns, the Bavarians lost from 20 to 70 dead and from 100 to 150 wounded. The Austrians and Tyroleans under Andreas Hofer suffered 50 dead and 30 wounded. Discouraged by the lack of local support, the Tyroleans withdrew to the south. They returned to attack again on 29 May in the second battle. Deroy's 5,240 soldiers and 18 guns held their ground, losing 87 dead, 156 wounded, and 53 missing. The 1,200 Austrian regulars and 13,600 Tyroleans lost 90 dead and 160 wounded. Low on ammunition and food, Deroy evacuated Innsbruck on 30 May and retreated to Kufstein.

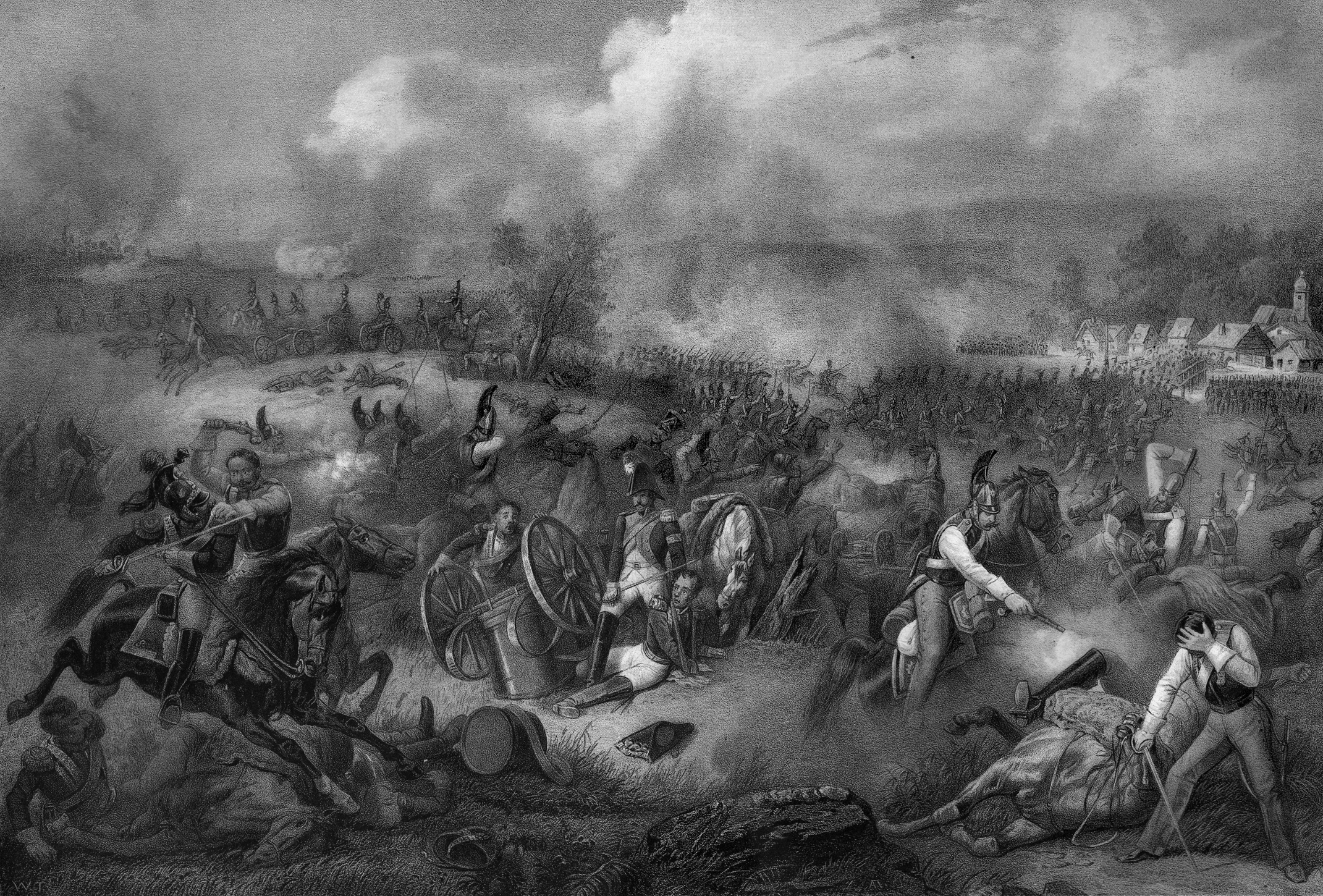
Deroy was mortally wounded at the First Battle of Polotsk

After Napoleon's victory in the Battle of Wagram on 5 and 6 July, Lefebvre and Deroy reoccupied Innsbruck. In the third battle of Bergisel on 13 August, 18,000 Tyroleans sharply defeated Deroy's 3,000 troops. The Bavarians suffered 200 dead and 250 wounded while the irregulars lost 100 dead and 220 wounded. After taking hostages, Lefebvre ordered another retreat and the Tyrol was cleared of Bavarians by 18 August. On 17 October, the Tyroleans were surprised and badly beaten at Bodenbichl by General-Major Rechberg. After this, the three divisions of VII Corps retook the Tyrol. The fourth battle of Bergisel was fought and won by Wrede's troops on 1 November and the rebellion was stamped out. Deroy was promoted to General of Infantry on 1 January 1811.

When Napoleon invaded the Russian Empire in 1812, Deroy commanded the 19th Infantry Division in Laurent de Gouvion Saint-Cyr's VI Corps. A discouraged Deroy wrote to King Maximilian Joseph on 22 June that he did not see how they would survive. The march into Russia was difficult and the Bavarian general reported to his king that the food was bad and the soldiers' uniforms and shoes had worn out. Because of this, he wrote, discipline was breaking down and the troops were depressed and insubordinate.

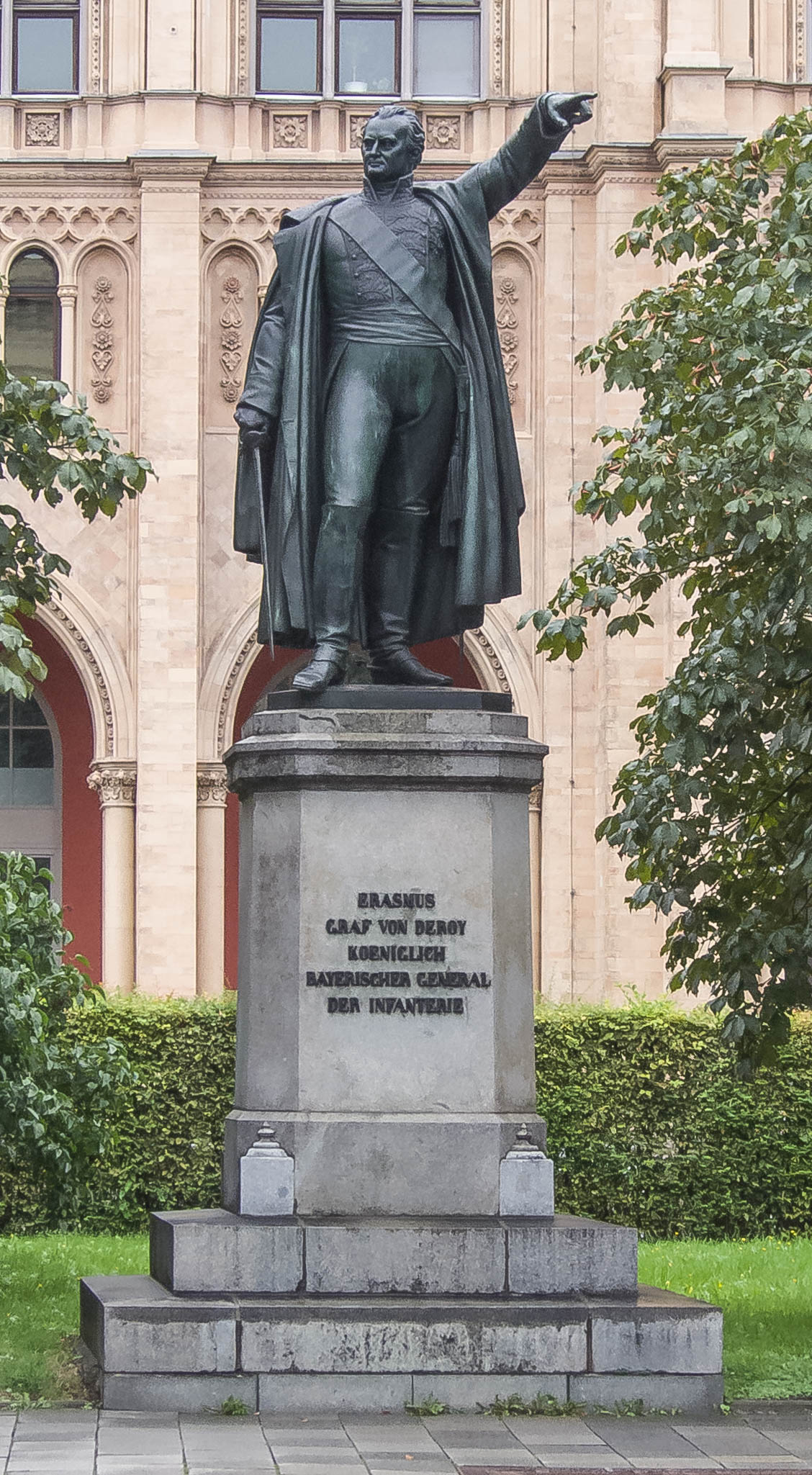
Statue of Deroy at the Maximilianstraße in Munich by Johann Halbig

The First Battle of Polotsk began on 16 August, with Marshal Nicolas Oudinot commanding the II and VI Corps against Peter Wittgenstein's Russian I Corps. On the first day, the 30,000 Russians defeated the 24,000 Allies and Oudinot was wounded. Saint-Cyr took command and withdrew most of his troops to the south bank of the Daugava River on 17 August. He then built a concealed bridge and secretly shifted his small army to the north bank on the night of 17–18 August. At 3:00 PM, Saint-Cyr attacked the surprised Russians with the Bavarian VI Corps on the right, the French II Corps in the center, and the French cavalry on the left. Covered by a bombardment from 30 cannons, Deroy's 19th Division stormed the village of Spas while Wrede's 20th Division attacked farther to the right. During the attack, Deroy was hit in the abdomen by a musket ball. He continued to lead his troops during the battle, but died of his injury on 23 August 1812. He was buried at the Saint Xavier Church in Polotsk. In recognition of his services, an order of nobility was bestowed on his wife and oldest son.
