= Tyrolean expedition =

Tyrolean expedition or Tyrolean campaign may refer to:

- Tyrolean expedition (1797), part of the War of the First Coalition
- Tyrolean Rebellion (1809), part of the War of the Fifth Coalition
  - Tyrolean campaign order of battle
