= Battle of Wörgl =

1809 battle during the War of the Fifth Coalition

- Part of the War of the Fifth Coalition
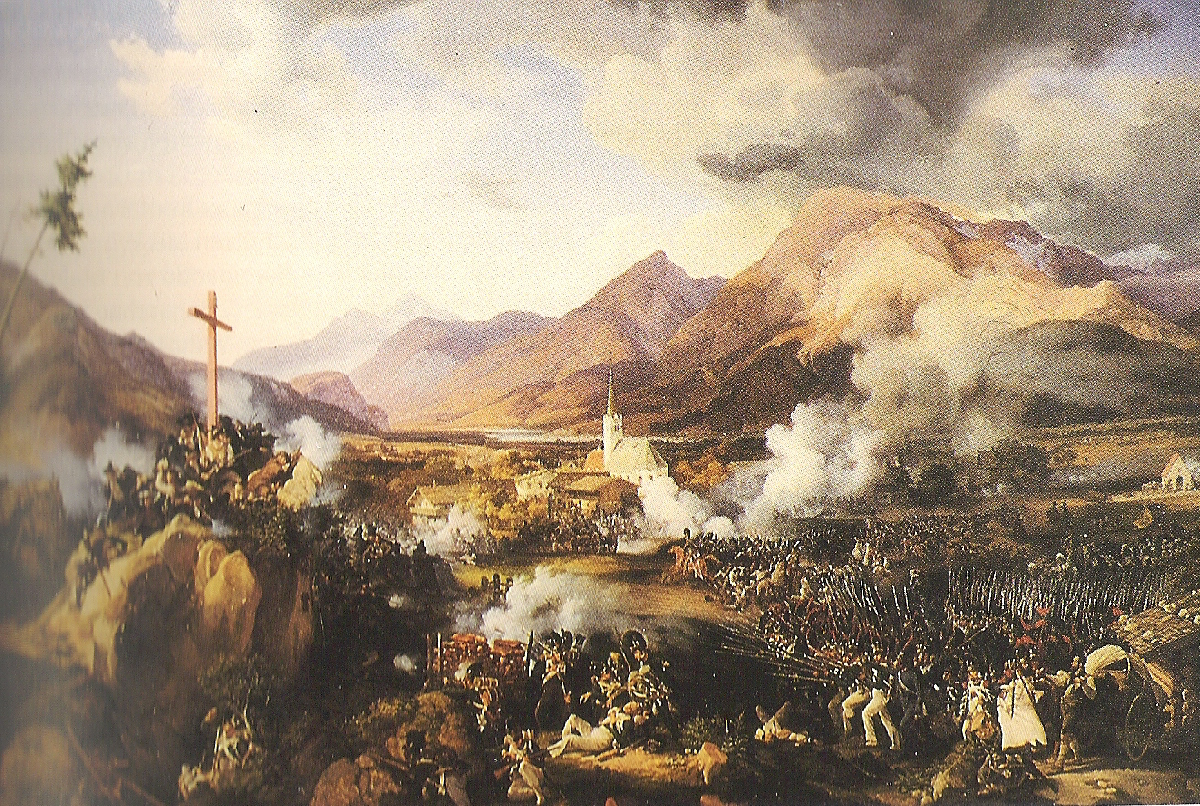
- Battle of Wörgl by Peter von Hess, 1832
Date	13 May 1809
Location	Wörgl, modern-day Austria 47°29′N 12°4′E
Result	Franco-Bavarian victory

Belligerents
Austrian Empire	(France) First French Empire; Kingdom of Bavaria

Commanders and leaders
(Austrian Empire) Johann Chasteler	(France) François Lefebvre (Kingdom of Bavaria) Karl von Wrede (Kingdom of Bavaria) Bernhard Deroy

Strength
5,000–8,000; 17 guns	9,000–9,450; 18 guns

Casualties and losses
600–3,000; 9 guns–11 guns	191

War of the Fifth Coalition
current battle
Napoleon in command
Napoleon not in command

The Battle of Wörgl or Wörgel was fought on 13 May 1809, when a Bavarian force under French Marshal François Joseph Lefebvre attacked an Austrian Empire detachment commanded by Johann Gabriel Chasteler de Courcelles. The Bavarians severely defeated Chasteler's soldiers in series of actions in the Austrian towns of Wörgl, Söll, and Rattenberg. Wörgl is located 20 kilometres (12 mi) south of the modern-day German border on the upper Inn River.

Civilian militia of the County of Tyrol rose in revolt under commander-in-chief Andreas Hofer supported by a strategic council at the start of the War of the Fifth Coalition. The hardy mountaineers rapidly banded together in irregular units and killed, captured, or routed the area's Bavarian and French garrisons. The patriot volunteering troopers were soon joined by Feldmarschall-Leutnant Chasteler's regular division sent from the Austrian Army of Inner Austria.

In mid-May, Lefebvre advanced on the Tyrol from the north and northeast with the Bavarian VII Corps. After the Bavarians mauled Chasteler's regulars at Wörgl, the Austrian general abandoned Tyrol and attempted to join with the retreating army in Hungary. The victory allowed the Bavarians to temporarily reoccupy Innsbruck, though not without additional fighting. The Tyrolean Civil Revolt, however, was far from over. Even after the regular Austrian armies met defeat at the Battle of Wagram in early July, the revolt resisted all efforts to stamp it out. The back of the rebellion was finally broken in November and only fizzed out in February 1810.

== Background ==
Brought under Bavarian rule after Austria's military defeat in the War of the Third Coalition, the County of Tyrol's inhabitants seethed against their new overlords. The Bavarian king did impose new rulings on the province, with which he crushed ages old Tyrolean social, military and religious feudal liberties. The Bavarian king also did impose conscription and did order a compulsory vaccination programme against smallpox. These tensions were fully exploited by Austria's agents, who circulated the territory in advance of the War of the Fifth Coalition. When Austria's armies invaded Bavaria and the Kingdom of Italy in April 1809, the Tyrol erupted in revolt against its occupiers. The Tyrolese militia, supported by irregulars quickly captured or routed most of the Bavarian and French garrisons. Not only did the revolt cut off French-Allied communications between Italy and Bavaria, but it connected the Austrian armies operating in the two theaters.

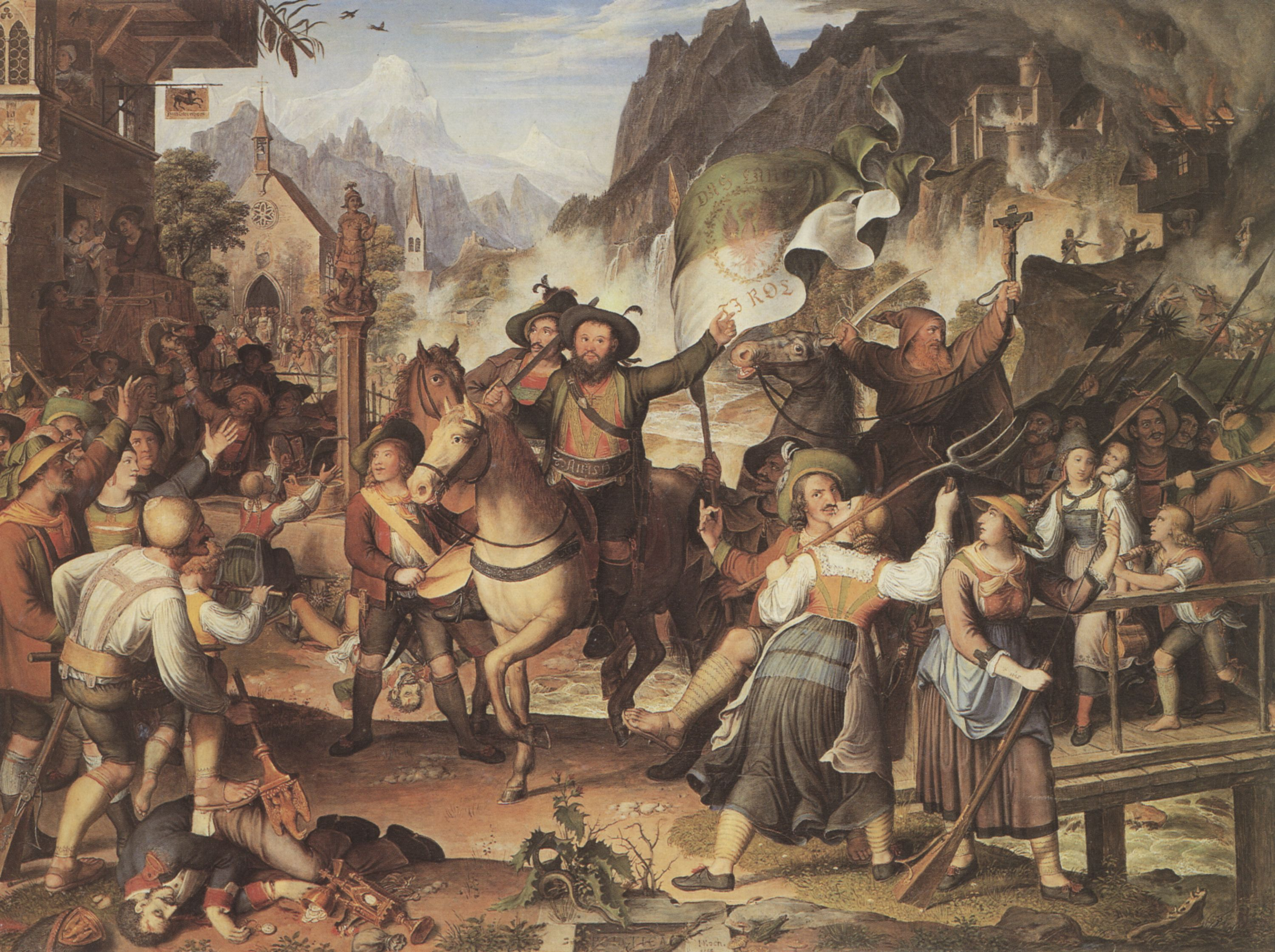
Tyrolean civil militia

Desiring to sustain the rebellion, Generalissimo Archduke Charles, Duke of Teschen ordered his brother Archduke John of Austria to detach a regular division to support the revolt. Accordingly, John sent Chasteler from the Army of Inner Austria. Before he arrived, the Tyroleans scored a tremendous early success at Innsbruck. For two days, the Tyrolean leader Major Martin Teimer harassed the local Bavarian garrisons with a large force of irregulars. On 13 May, Bavarian Lieutenant General Baron Kinkel surrendered four battalions, two squadrons, and five cannons, a total of 3,860 troops. Teimer's men also trapped a column of 2,050 French conscripts. After an ineffectual defense by hard-drinking General of Division Baptiste Pierre Bisson, the entire column surrendered along with the eagle of the 3rd Line Infantry Regiment.

The main Austrian armies were forced to retreat after Emperor Napoleon I of France defeated Feldmarschall-Leutnant Johann von Hiller at the Battle of Landshut on 21 April and Archduke Charles at the Battle of Eckmühl on 22 April. On 27 April Napoleon ordered Lefebvre's VII Corps to seize Salzburg. This was accomplished two days later, as Feldmarschall-Leutnant Franz Jellacic's Austrian division withdrew to the south.

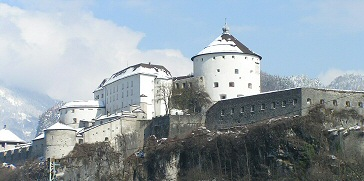
Kufstein fortress held out for a month.

On 1 May, General-Major Stengel's brigade of Lieutenant General Crown Prince Ludwig of Bavaria's division attacked the Lueg Pass near Golling an der Salzach. The 1,850 Bavarians were repelled by Captain Sessich's 420 men of the Warasdin-Kreutzer Grenz infantry Regiment. Stengel lost 200 casualties while the defenders only lost 30. Stengel probed the Leug Pass again on 4 and 5 May, while General-Major Raglovich (with Rechberg's brigade) moved against Abtenau, farther east. Again, the Austrians held their ground under the overall command of Jellacic, suffering 35 killed and wounded, and 70 captured. Bavarian losses were not reported. At about this time, General-Major Vincenti's brigade of Lieutenant General Bernhard Erasmus von Deroy's division suffered a minor defeat at the hands of the Tyrolean rebels. Lefebvre proposed to Napoleon that he send two battalions of reinforcements to aid Vincenti. The emperor criticized this idea and instead directed the marshal to march to the relief of Kufstein Fortress with the better part of his corps. Accordingly, Lefebvre advanced on Kufstein with Deroy and Lieutenant General Karl Philipp von Wrede's divisions, leaving the Crown Prince's division to hold Salzburg.

On 11 May, Deroy relieved Kufstein and its 576-man Bavarian garrison. Major D'Aicher had resisted 3,000 Tyrolean and Austrian besiegers for exactly a month. The same day, Wrede advanced southeast from Salzburg to attack 600 Tyroleans at Lofer. The Bavarians lost 22 dead and 44 wounded, while inflicting about 70 casualties on their opponents. Wrede pressed on with 7,500 soldiers to Waidring where he battled General-Major Franz Fenner on 12 May. Fenner's 9th Jäger battalion, three squadrons of light horse, six guns, and 1,000 irregulars were driven off with about 100 casualties. The Bavarians lost 40 dead and wounded.

== Battle ==
The Tyrol 1809 Order of Battle lists the regular units of both armies and their organization.

Wörgl is located about 15 kilometres (9 mi) to the southwest of Kufstein, while Söll is about 10 kilometres (6 mi) east of Wörgl. Advancing through Sankt Johann in Tirol, Wrede approached the village of Söll from the east. Meanwhile, Deroy's division was in the Inn valley in the direction of Kufstein. (Note: Google Earth was used to verify distances and directions between the towns.)

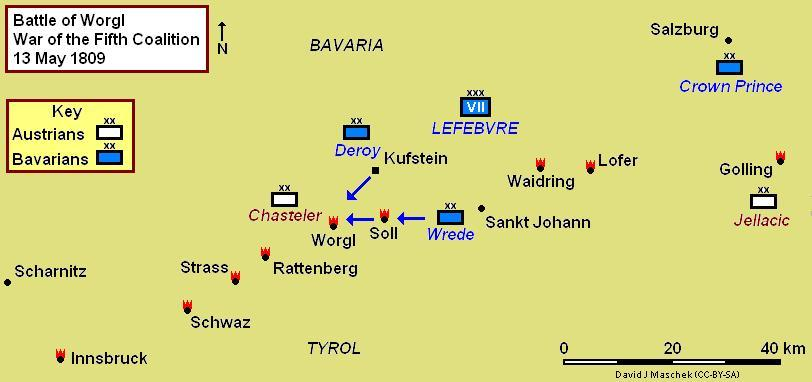
Battle of Wörgl campaign map

Chasteler attempted to stop the Bavarians with 5,000 mostly regular troops organized in 11 and one-half battalions, three and one-half squadrons, and 17 guns. This force included a tiny reinforcement from Jellacic's division, four companies of the de Vaux Infantry Regiment Nr. 45 and a half squadron of the O'Reilly Chevau-léger Regiment Nr. 3. The Austrians suffered a severe defeat and retreated southwest up the Inn valley. During the withdrawal, there was more fighting at Rattenberg.

Historian Digby Smith reported that 3,000 Austrians were killed, wounded, and captured. The Bavarians seized nine guns, 27 ammunition wagons, and three colors and "effectively destroyed" Chasteler's command. Smith listed 8,000 infantry, 1,450 cavalry, and 18 guns as engaged in the fighting under Wrede's command. Smith did not list Deroy's troops, though they were nearby. Francis Loraine Petre noted that 600 Austrians and 11 guns were captured, but did not mention killed and wounded.

On 14 and 15 May, Wrede clashed with 3,000 Tyrolean Landwehr and irregulars under Josef Speckbacher at Strass im Zillertal and Schwaz. The Bavarians reported 33 dead and 158 wounded while their adversaries lost 90 dead and wounded, plus 185 captured. Lefebvre occupied Innsbruck by 20 May and optimistically reported that the uprising would soon be suppressed. Deroy's division held its own during the first and second Battles of Bergisel on 25 and 29 May. However, the revolt was only temporarily repressed.

Following orders from Archduke John, Chasteler withdrew the remnant of his division from the Tyrol, moving down the Drava River valley. With 4,000 to 5,000 troops, he attacked General of Division Jean-Baptiste Dominique Rusca's Italian division at Klagenfurt on 9 June. Chasteler was repulsed but slipped away to Maribor (Marburg an der Drau) and safety. For a short time, his march severed communications between Eugène de Beauharnais' army and northeast Italy. Chasteler briefly joined Feldmarschall-Leutnant Ignaz Gyulai's corps, but soon separated in an attempt to reach Archduke John's army. He ended the war trying without success to interfere with the siege of Győr (Raab) in Hungary.

After Napoleon's defeat at the Battle of Aspern-Essling and his subsequent concentration of troops for a decisive battle, the Tyrolean revolt flared again and the rebels scored many successes in June and July. Lefebvre reoccupied Innsbruck, but the Tyroleans beat the Bavarians in the third Battle of Bergisel on 13 August, chasing them out of the mountains again. Jean-Baptiste Drouet, Comte d'Erlon replaced Lefebvre and won a clear cut victory over the rebels in the fourth Battle of Bergisel on 1 November.

== Notes ==
Preceded by Second Battle of Porto	Napoleonic Wars; Battle of Wörgl	Succeeded by Battle of Tarvis (1809)
