= Tyrolean Rebellion =

1809 resistance of Tyrolean civilians against Napoleon

- Part of the War of the Fifth Coalition
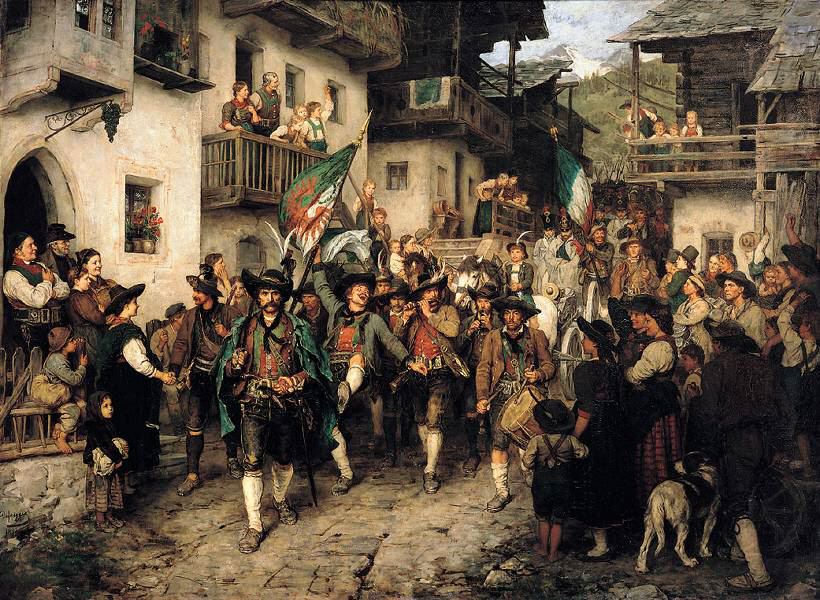
- Homecoming of Tyrolean Militia by Franz Defregger
Date	April–November 1809
Location	Tyrol
Result	French victory

Belligerents
France; Kingdom of Bavaria; Italy; Saxony	Tyrolean civilian militia (Schützen) Supported by: Austrian Empire

Commanders and leaders
(First French Empire) François-Joseph Lefebvre; (First French Empire) Jean-Baptiste Drouet; (Kingdom of Italy (Napoleonic)) Eugène de Beauharnais; (Kingdom of Bavaria) Karl Philipp von Wrede	Andreas Hofer (executed); Josef Speckbacher; Joachim Haspinger; Peter Mayr; Martin Teimer; Kajetan Sveth

Strength
40,000	80,000

Casualties and losses
5,000	12,250

War of the Fifth Coalition:
Tyrolean Civil Revolt

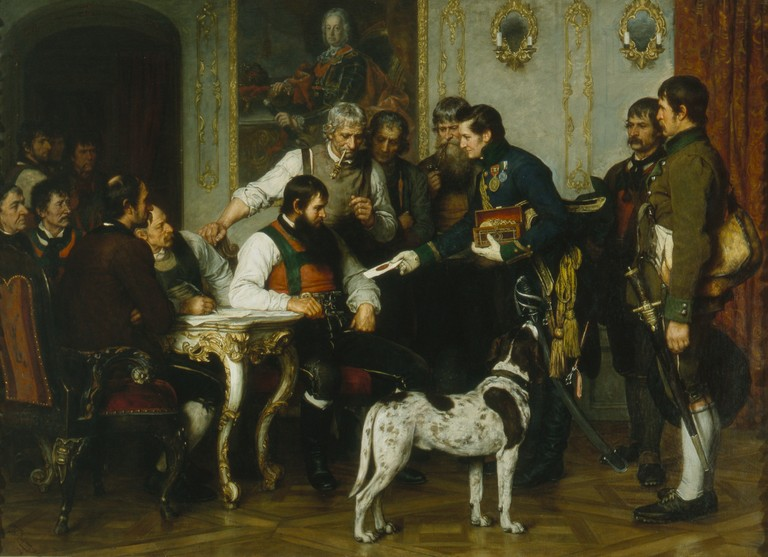
Andreas Hofer and strategy council, painting by Franz von Defregger

The Tyrolean Rebellion (German: Tiroler Volksaufstand) was an 1809 rebellion in the County of Tyrol against the Bavarian and French occupation of Tyrol during the War of the Fifth Coalition. Led by Andreas Hofer, the rebellion was initially successful in freeing the County of Bavarian occupation, but was later squashed by French troops. The rebellion was later mythologized as a part of Austrian nationalist historiography.

== Backgrounds ==
=== Governing and military situation ===
In September 1805, during the War of the Third Coalition, the Electorate of Bavaria allied with Napoleonic France against Austria and Russia. Napoleon quickly defeated Austria and Russia, and imposed the Peace of Pressburg (1805), by which Bavaria was elevated to a kingdom and gained French-occupied Tyrol, which had been held by the House of Habsburg since 1363. Napoleon officially handed over the County of Tyrol to Bavaria on 11 February 1806. (The area awarded to Bavaria included Trentino, which had not been part of the County of Tyrol until the Prince-Bishopric of Trent was secularized in 1803.)

=== Policies ===
In its policies and legislation, the Bavarian government under minister Count Montgelas angered the Tyrolean population in several ways. Bavaria imposed new laws, reorganized the school system, abolished the Tyrolean people's age-old right to self-defence (Wehrverfassung), and raised taxes. At the same time Bavaria barred exports, e.g. of cattle, from Tyrol into Bavaria. Furthermore, the state meddled with religious activities in Tyrol, banning traditional rural holidays, the ringing of church bells, processions etc. which were a vital part of Tyrolean culture. Additionally, on 1 May 1808, the County of Tyrol was disestablished and administratively split up into the three districts of Inn, Eisack, and Etsch. The new Bavarian constitution also replaced long existing feudal rights of the Tyrolean population, such as not having to fight in a foreign army and outside Tyrol's borders. Conscription was thus introduced in Tyrol, and Tyroleans were called into Bavarian military service, which led to open revolt. Bavaria had to provide soldiers for Napoleon's devastating wars in Russia and Spain, from which few or none expected to return. On top of this, the Bavarians ordered compulsory smallpox vaccination in 1807, with massive fines for refusal. For the Tyroleans this was pure blasphemy.

== Outbreak and course of the rebellion ==
The Tyrolean uprising broke out with the flight to Innsbruck of young men due conscription into the Bavarian Army at Axams on 12 and 13 March 1809. These men in hiding were in contact with the Austrian court in Vienna through Baron Joseph Hormayr, an Innsbruck-born Hofrat and close friend of Archduke John of Austria. Austria, citing a breach of the conditions agreed in the Peace of Pressburg guaranteeing Tyrolean autonomy, declared war on the Bavaria and France on 9 April 1809. Archduke John explicitly stated that Bavaria had forfeited all rights to Tyrol, which rightfully belonged with to Austria, and therefore any resistance against Bavarian occupation would be legitimate.

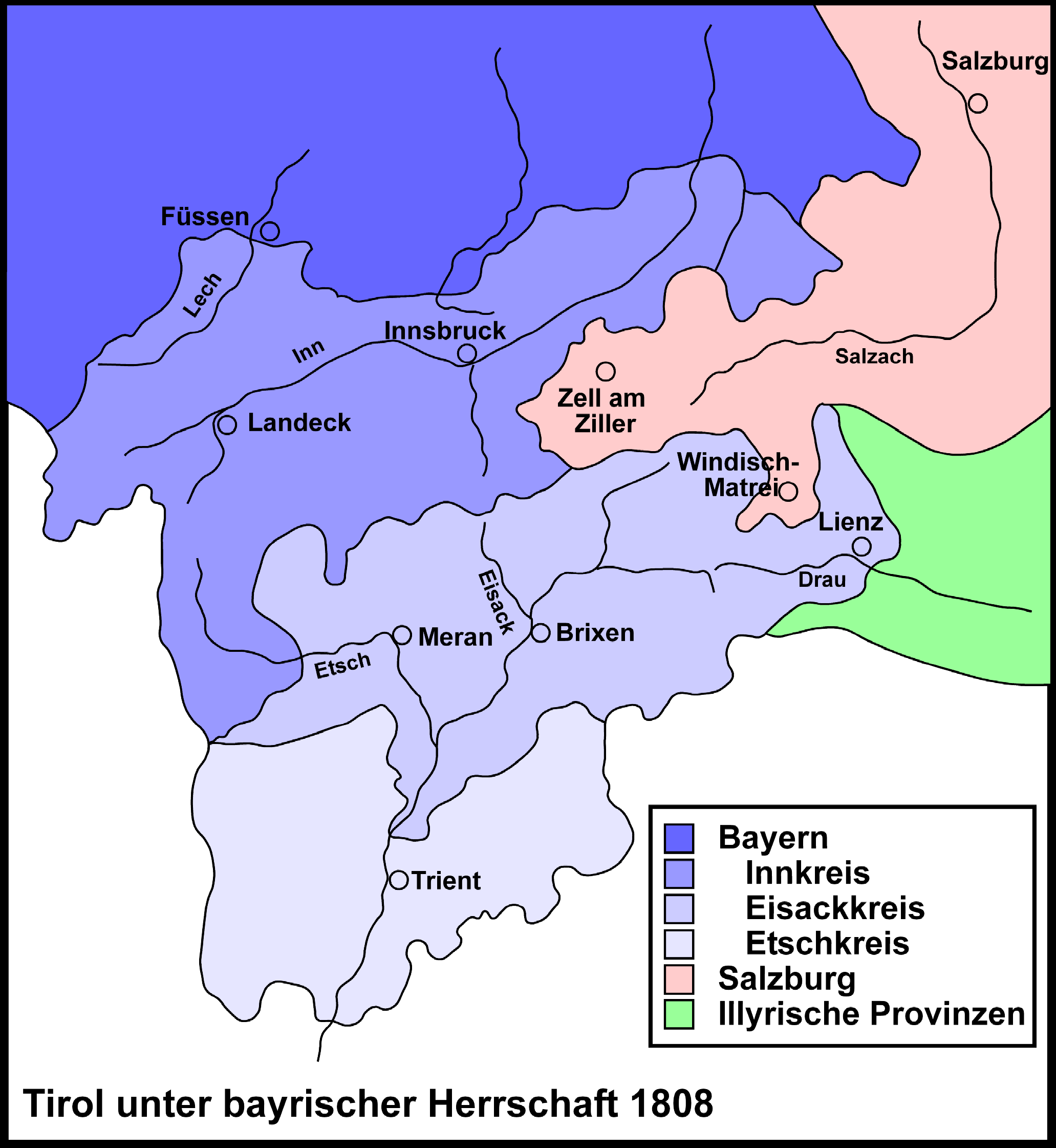
Tyrolean districts, 1808

An Austrian corps under General Johann Gabriel Chasteler de Courcelles, operating from Carinthia, occupied Lienz and marched against Innsbruck, but was defeated at Wörgl on 13 May by Bavarian troops led by French Marshal François Joseph Lefebvre.

Meanwhile, responding to the declaration of war, an army of Tyrolean citizen militia (Schützen), joined by peasants, craftsmen, and other civilians, gathered around Sterzing. Under the command of innkeeper, wine merchant, and cattle dealer Andreas Hofer and marched north through the Brenner Pass to the outskirts of Innsbruck. There they fortified Bergisel hill. In the First and Second Battles of Bergisel on 12 April and 25 May, the Tyroleans defeated the Bavarians, who were forced to retreat.

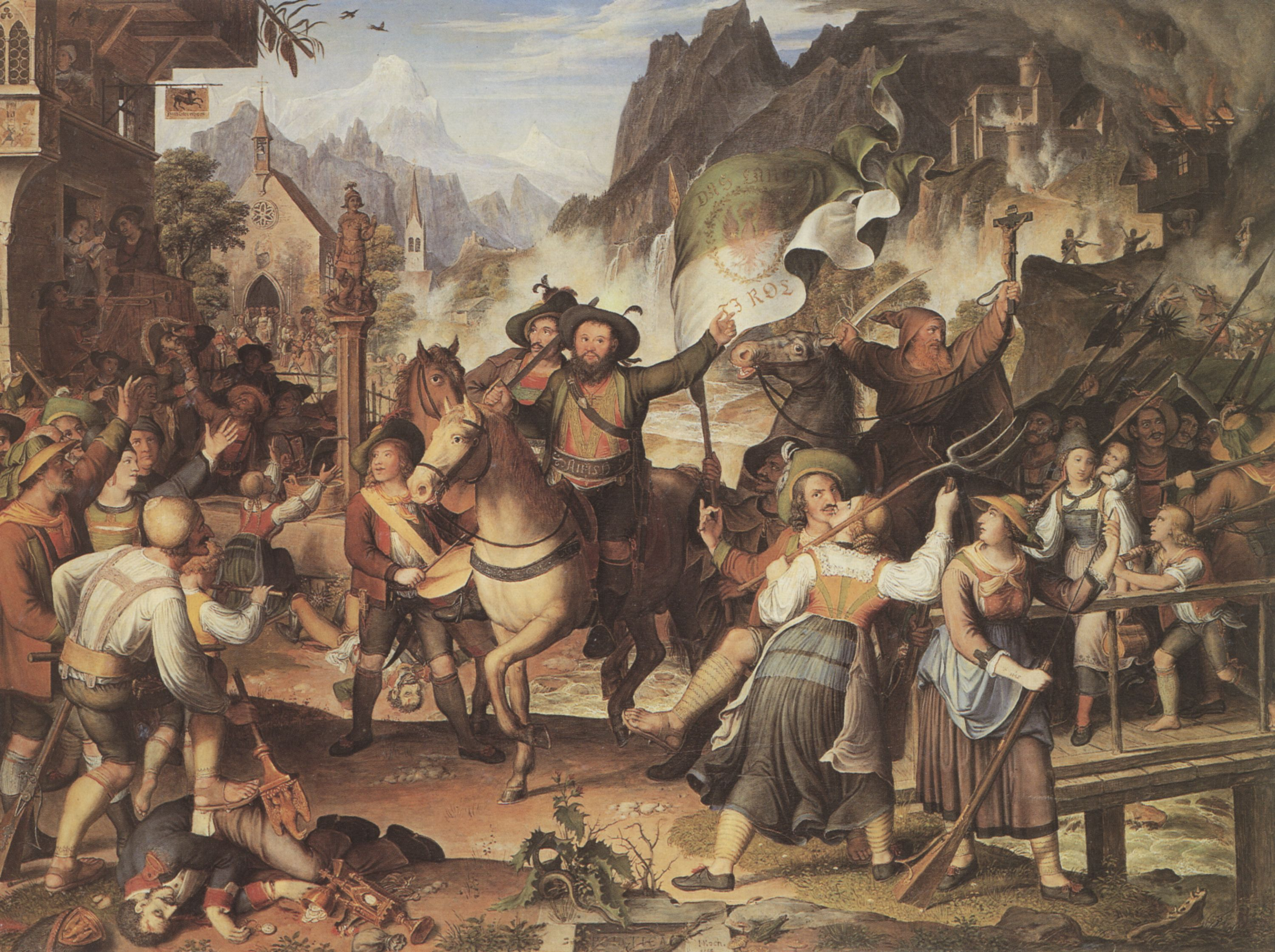
Der Landsturm anno 1809 by Joseph Anton Koch, c. 1820

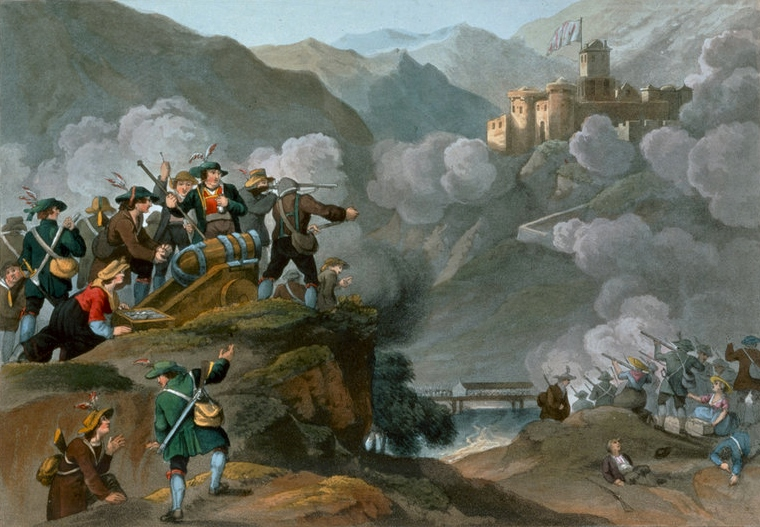
The Siege of the Kufstein Fortress

The Tyroleans celebrated the news that Napoleon had suffered defeat at the Battle of Aspern-Essling on 22 May. Nevertheless, after the French again gained the upper hand at the Battle of Wagram on 5-6 July, Archduke Charles of Austria signed the Armistice of Znaim, and Austrian forces withdraw from Tyrol. Thus the rebels, who had their strongholds in Southern Tyrol, were left fighting alone. However, they defeated the French and Bavarians under Marshal Lefebvre several times in July, culminating in a complete French retreat after the Third Battle of Bergisel on 12-13 August. Hofer now took over the administration of the unoccupied territories at Innsbruck; large parts of Tyrol enjoyed a brief period of independence.

However, Napoleon had defeated Austria, and in the Treaty of Schönbrunn of 14 October, ending the War of the Fifth Coalition, Emperor Francis I of Austria officially gave up any claims to Tyrol. Napoleon ordered the re-conquest of the province the same day. A combination of French military force under the new command of General Jean-Baptiste Drouet and pacifying measures by the rather pro-Tyrolean and anti-Napoleonic Bavarian commander, Prince Ludwig, caused many Tyrolean rebels to submit. The last rebel troops were defeated at the Fourth Battle of Bergisel on 1 November This effectively suppressed the revolt despite minor Tyrolean victories later in November.

== Aftermath and execution of Andreas Hofer ==
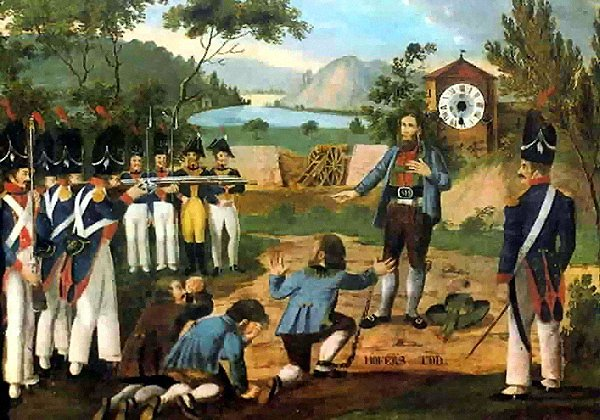
The execution of Andreas Hofer in Mantua by Napoleon's officers, 1810

Many of the Tyrolean fighters were killed by the French and Bavarian forces in the following weeks. The leader Andreas Hofer fled into the mountains and hid at several places in South Tyrol. He was betrayed to the French near St Martin in Passeier on 28 January 1810. Hofer was arrested and brought to Mantua, where Eugène de Beauharnais, the French viceroy of Italy, first wanted to pardon him, but was overruled by his stepfather Napoleon. The death penalty was issued on 19 February and executed the next day. Hofer's mortal remains were buried at the Court Church, Innsbruck in 1823.

In consequence of the civilian insurrection, Bavaria pressured by the French on 28 February 1810 had to cede large parts of Southern Tyrol with the Trentino to Italy and the eastern Hochpustertal with Lienz to the Illyrian Provinces. Upon Napoleon's fall in 1814 and the agreements negotiated at the Congress of Vienna, all parts of Tyrol were re-united under Austrian rule.

In the 19th century, the civilian resistance against suppression of Bavarian rulers and Napoleon, the leadership of Andreas Hofer and his execution on Napoleon's order became part of the national narrative, partly transformed into legends and myths, especially for the German speaking Tyrolese. The song Zu Mantua in Banden deals with the execution of Hofer and the fight against the foreign occupants. It became the anthem of the Austrian State of Tyrol in 1948. Hofer's story has been brought to the screen in 1929 in the movie Andreas Hofer - Der Freiheitskampf des Tiroler Volkes (Andres Hofer - The Fight for Freedom of the Tyrolean people). Hofer's life and death was the model for the 1932 film Der Rebell by Luis Trenker. In the 2015 documentary Andreas Hofer – Held wider Willen(Andres Hofer - Hero against his will), historians show results of research shifting facts from myths.

== Sources ==
- Mikaberidze, Alexander (2020). The Napoleonic Wars: A Global History. Oxford: Oxford University Press. ISBN 978-0-19-995106-2.

Preceded by Battle of Valls	Napoleonic Wars; Tyrolean Rebellion	Succeeded by Battle of Villafranca (1809)
