= Johann Gabriel Chasteler de Courcelles =

Austrian general (1763–1825)

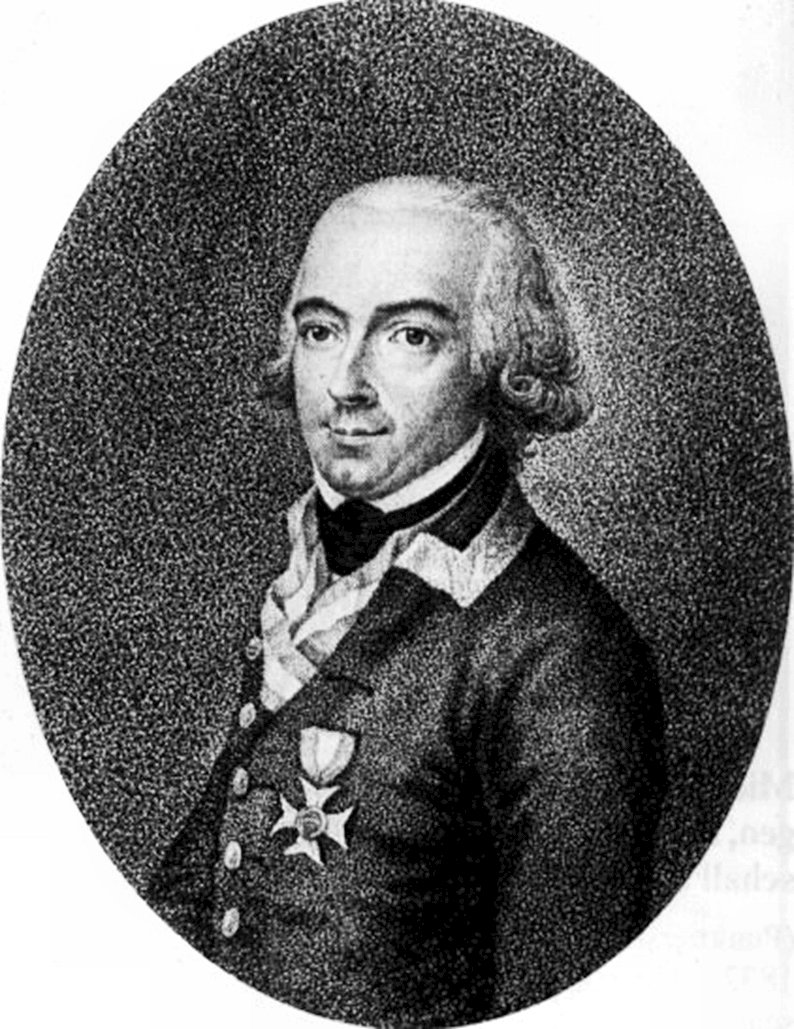
- Johann Gabriel Chasteler de Courcelles
- Born: 22 January 1763; Mons, Austrian Netherlands
- Died: 7 May 1825 (aged 62); Venice, Kingdom of Lombardy–Venetia
- Military career
- Allegiance: Habsburg monarchy Austrian Empire
- Branch: Engineers
- Service years: 1776 – 1825
- Rank: Feldzeugmeister
- Conflicts: Austro-Turkish War (1787–1791); French Revolutionary Wars: • Battle of Cassano (1799); • Battle of Trebbia (1799); Napoleonic Wars
- Awards: Military Order of Maria Theresa, KC 1790, CC 1799; Order of Leopold, 1809
- Other work: Inhaber Infantry Regiment # 64; Inhaber, Infantry Regiment # 46; Inhaber, Infantry Regiment # 27; Privy Councillor, 1816

His tomb in Venice.

Johann Gabriel Josef Albert, Marquess of Chasteler and Courcelles (22 January 1763 – 7 May 1825) was a Walloon, born near Mons, Austrian Netherlands. He entered the military service of Habsburg Austria at an early age and trained as an engineer at the Ingenieurakademie in Vienna. Serving as chief of staff to Spleny in the Turkish War from 1788, he won the Ritterkreuz (Knight's Cross) of the Order of Maria Theresa for outstanding bravery at the Battle of Focsani in action against the Ottoman Turks.

== Family ==
He was born the eldest son of François-Gabriel-Joseph du Chasteler de Courcelles and Albertine, daughter of Johan, Graf von Thürnheim (1742–1765).

== French Revolutionary Wars ==
In the War of the First Coalition against the French First Republic he served as an engineer on the Rhine, distinguishing himself at Mainz in 1795. Promoted to general officer in 1796 he served under the Archduke Charles in Germany.

In 1799 Chasteler was appointed Generalquartiermeister (chief of staff) to Suvorov and commander of a wing of the Austrian army in Italy. Serving at the Battle of Cassano 27 April, he invested Tortona in May, but was wounded at Alessandria, 16 July. By the time of the Battle of the Trebbia he was assigned to Ott's division. Elevated to Commander of the Order of Maria Theresa and made chief of staff in Southern Germany in 1800, he serving at Engen and Mösskirch, before leading a Brigade in the Tyrol, distinguishing himself at the action of Scharnitz.

== Napoleonic Wars ==
At the opening of the War of the Third Coalition, in 1805 he was appointed to lead an advance guard division in the Tyrol, where he successfully covered the retreat of the Archduke John, notably at the Strub Pass.

== 1809 ==
The Hofkriegsrat appointed Chasteler to lead the VIII Armeekorps in Archduke John's Army of Inner Austria at the beginning of the War of the Fifth Coalition. Immediately, he was detached with 10,000 troops and sent to assist the revolt in the Tyrol and Albert Gyulay took his place as corps commander. On 13 May he was badly beaten at the Battle of Wörgl by Lefebvre's Bavarian VII Corps. Repeatedly prevented from rejoining John's forces his command ended the campaign at Lake Balaton in July. After the peace he was appointed Military Commander of the Austrian Silesia.

== 1813 ==
In 1813 he commanded the defences of Prague, then commanded a Corps of the Army of Bohemia under Schwarzenberg, serving at Kulm and Tortona 16 May. Nominated Governor of the Theresienstadt Fortifications, after Leipzig he was given the command of Klenau's Army Corps. In 1814 after the establishment of the new Lombardo-Venetian Kingdom, Chasteler was in charge of the Venetian defences.

He was the Proprietor (Inhaber) of an Austrian infantry regiment on three occasions.

== Character ==
Chasteler was regarded as a competent professional, representing "the last generation of the talented and lively southern Netherlanders in the Austrian Army. He was brave as well as expert, but also bespectacled and short-sighted - an unfortunate combination of characteristics with brought him into the path of many a missile in the course of his career" As the commander of an Army Corps in 1809 however his performance was "vacillating".
