= Battle of Piave River (1809) order of battle =

The Piave River 1809 order of battle shows the units and organization for the Franco-Italian and Austrian Empire armies that fought in the Battle of Piave River on 8 May 1809. Eugène de Beauharnais, the viceroy of the Kingdom of Italy defeated Archduke John of Austria. Eugène's Advance Guard crossed the river first and was assailed by Austrian cavalry and artillery. The French cavalry routed the opposing cavalry and captured 14 enemy guns. A lull followed as John arranged his infantry in a formidable defensive position. Meanwhile, Eugène struggled to pour reinforcements into the bridgehead as the Piave rose dangerously. In the afternoon, the viceroy sent Paul Grenier to drive back the Austrian left while Jacques MacDonald mounted an assault on the center. The attack succeeded in breaking the Austrian line and compelling John to order a retreat.

== Franco-Italian Army ==
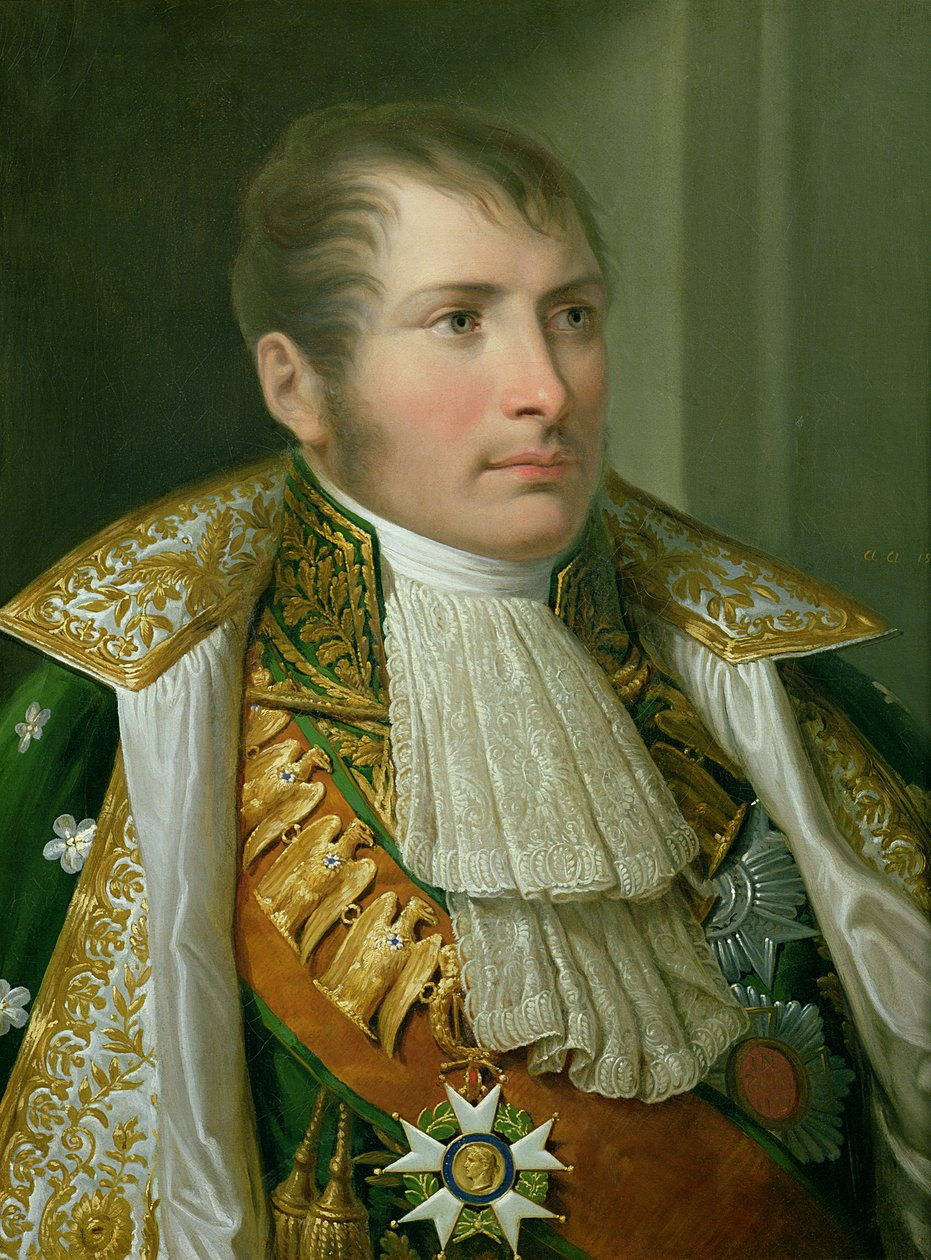
Eugène de Beauharnais

Army of Italy: Eugène de Beauharnais

=== Advance Guard and Reserve ===
- Artillery: General of Division Jean-Barthélemot Sorbier
  - 12-pound foot battery (8 guns)
- Advance Guard: General of Brigade Joseph Marie, Count Dessaix (4,980, 4 guns)
  - Brigade: Colonel Nagle
    - Converged Voltiguers (2,200)
  - Brigade: Major Vautre
    - Converged Voltiguers (2,100)
  - Attached:
    - 9th Chasseurs à cheval (540)
    - 4-pound horse battery (4 guns)
- Division: General of Division Jean-Mathieu Seras (7,500, 10 guns)
  - 1st Brigade:
    - 4th Battalion/35th Line Infantry Regiment
    - 53rd Line Infantry Regiment (4 battalions)
  - 2nd Brigade:
    - 79th Line Infantry Regiment (2 battalions)
    - 106th Line Infantry Regiment (3 battalions)
  - Attached: 8-pound foot battery, 4-pound foot battery (12 guns)
- Italian Guard: General of Brigade Teodoro Lechi (2,580, 6 guns)
  - Brigade:
    - Italian Guard Velites Battalion
    - Italian Honor Guard Squadron
  - Brigade:
    - Italian Guard Chasseurs Battalion
    - Italian Guard Grenadiers Battalion
    - Italian Guard Dragoon Regiment (2 squadrons)
  - Attached: 6-pound horse battery (6 guns)

=== MacDonald's Corps ===
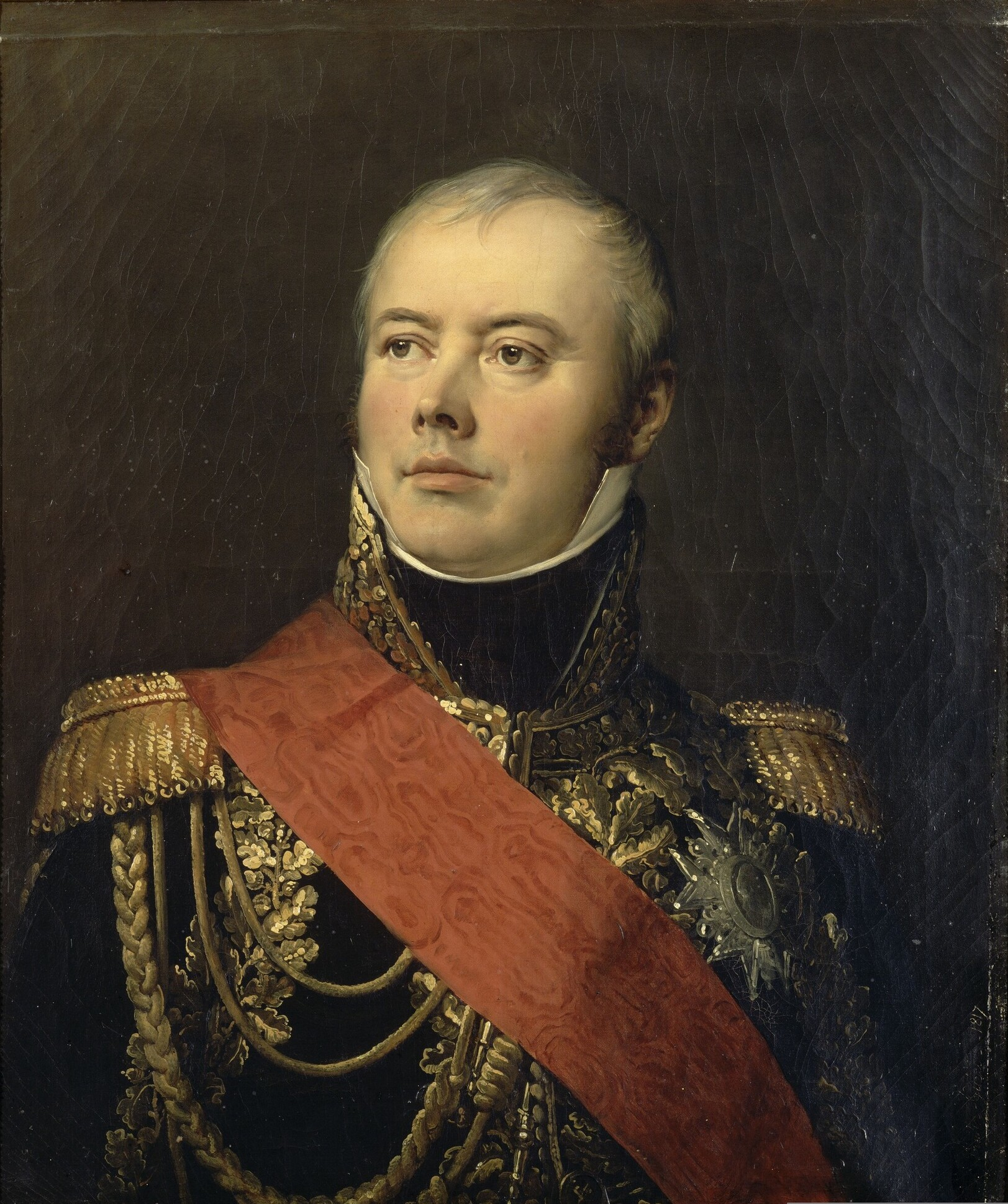
Jacques MacDonald

General of Division Jacques MacDonald (14,580, 24 guns)

- 1st Division: General of Division Jean-Baptiste Broussier
  - 1st Brigade:
    - 9th Line Infantry Regiment (3 battalions)
    - 4th Battalion/11th Line Infantry Regiment
  - 2nd Brigade:
    - 84th Line Infantry Regiment (4 battalions)
    - 92nd Line Infantry Regiment (3 battalions)
  - Attached: 8-pound foot battery, 4-pound foot battery (12 guns)
- 2nd Division: General of Division Jean Maximilien Lamarque
  - 1st Brigade:
    - 18th Light Infantry Regiment (2 battalions)
    - 13th Line Infantry Regiment (4 battalions)
  - 2nd Brigade:
    - 23rd Line Infantry Regiment (2 battalions)
    - 29th Line Infantry Regiment (4 battalions)
  - Attached: 8-pound foot battery, 4-pound foot battery (12 guns)

=== Grenier's Corps ===
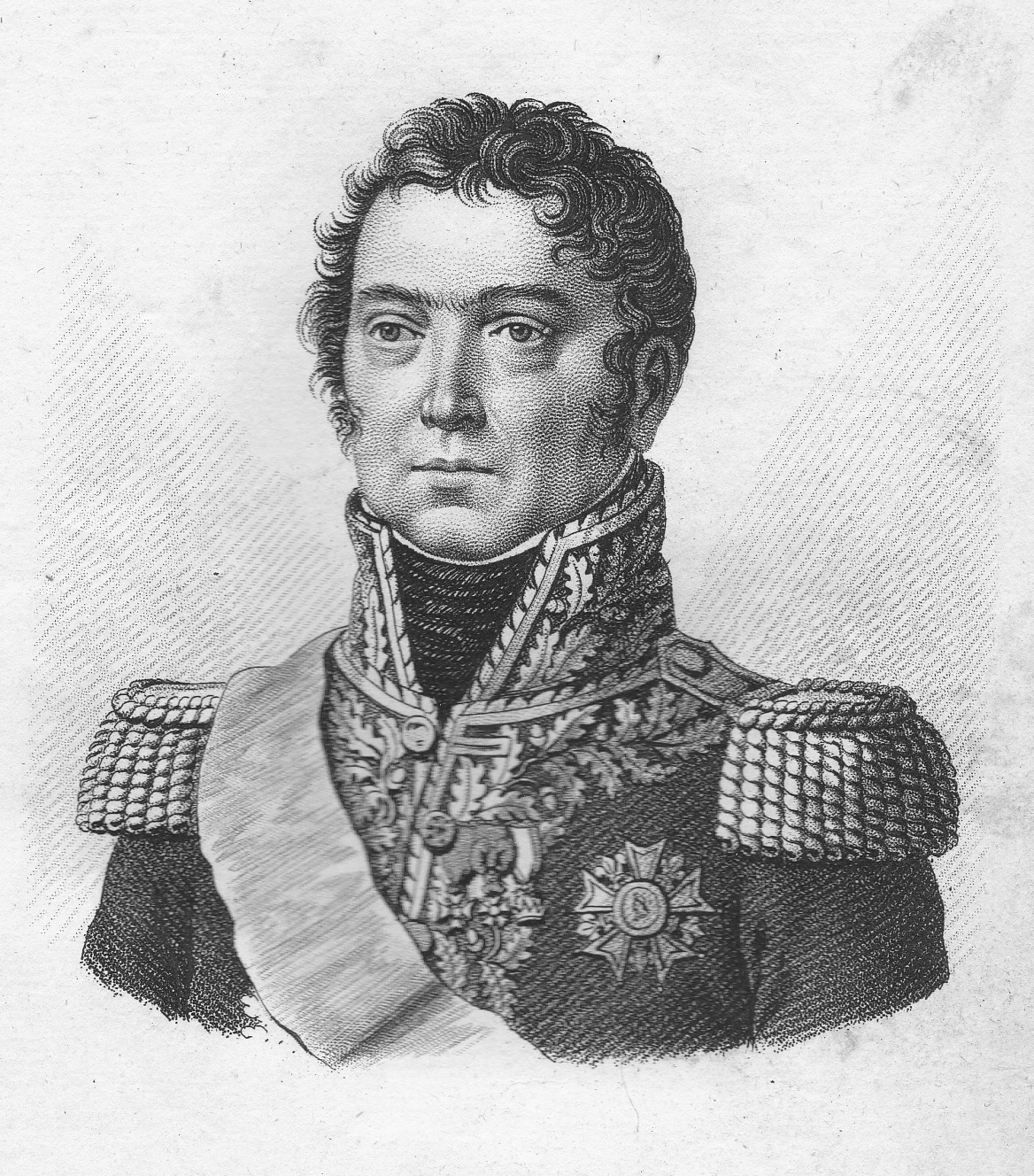
Paul Grenier

General of Division Paul Grenier (16,800, 18 guns)

- 1st Division: General of Brigade Louis Jean Nicolas Abbé
  - 1st Brigade:
    - 8th Light Infantry Regiment (2 battalions)
    - 1st Line Infantry Regiment (4 battalions)
  - 2nd Brigade:
    - 52nd Line Infantry Regiment (4 battalions)
    - 102nd Line Infantry Regiment (4 battalions)
    - Napoleone Dragoon Regiment (1 squadron)
  - Attached: 8-pound foot battery, 4-pound foot battery (12 guns)
- 2nd Division: General of Division Pierre François Joseph Durutte
  - 1st Brigade:
    - 22nd Light Infantry Regiment (2 battalions)
    - 23rd Line Infantry Regiment (4 battalions)
  - 2nd Brigade:
    - 60th Line Infantry Regiment (2 battalions)
    - 62nd Line Infantry Regiment (2 battalions)
  - Attached: 6-pound foot battery (6 guns)

=== Baraguey d'Hilliers' Corps ===
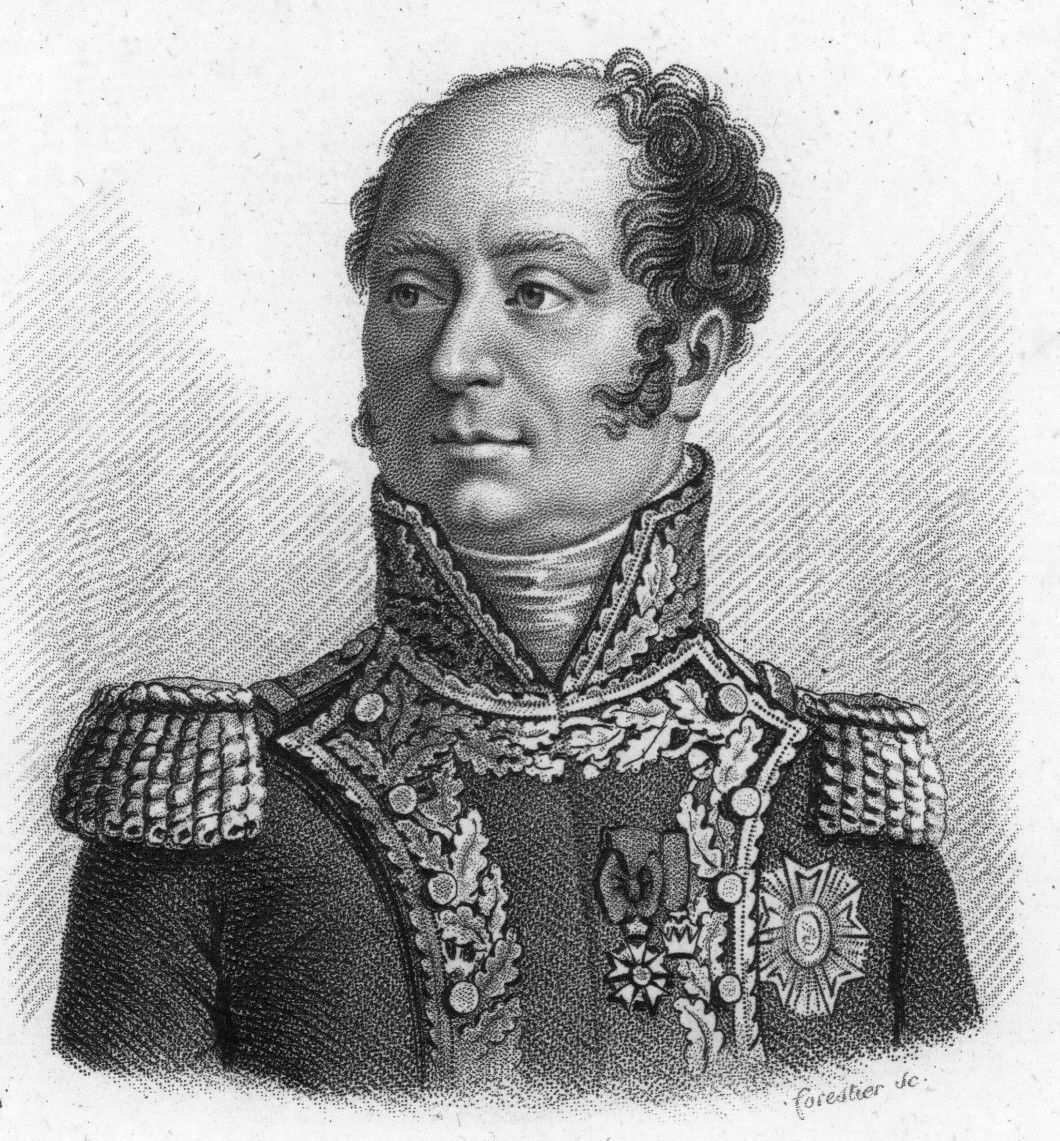
Louis Baraguey d'Hilliers

General of Division Louis Baraguey d'Hilliers (21,000, 18 guns)

- 1st Division: General of Division Achille Fontanelli
  - 1st Brigade:
    - 1st Italian Line Infantry Regiment (3 battalions)
    - 2nd Italian Line Infantry Regiment (1 battalion)
    - 3rd Italian Line Infantry Regiment (3 battalions)
  - 2nd Brigade:
    - 7th Italian Line IR (2 battalions)
    - Dalmatian Infantry Regiment (2 battalions)
    - 112th Line Infantry Regiment (3 battalions)
  - Attached: 6-pound foot battery (6 guns)
- 2nd Division: General of Division Jean-Baptiste Dominique Rusca (not present at Piave)
  - 1st Brigade:
    - 1st Italian Light Infantry Regiment (2 battalions)
    - 2nd Italian Light Infantry Regiment (2 battalions)
    - 4th Italian Line Infantry Regiment (2 battalions)
  - 2nd Brigade:
    - 67th Line Infantry Regiment (4 battalions)
    - 93rd Line Infantry Regiment (4 battalions)
    - 7th Dragoon Regiment (1 squadron)
  - Attached: Two 6-pound foot batteries (12 guns)

=== Grouchy's Cavalry ===
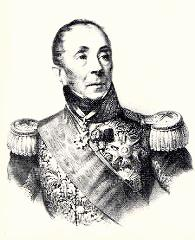
Emmanuel Grouchy

General of Division Emmanuel Grouchy (7,500, 12 guns)

- Sahuc's Light Cavalry Division: General of Division Louis Michel Antoine Sahuc
  - 6th Chasseurs à cheval (4 squadrons)
  - 8th Chasseurs à cheval (4 squadrons)
  - 25th Chasseurs à cheval (4 squadrons)
  - 6th Hussars (4 squadrons)
  - Attached: 4-pound horse battery (6 guns)
- Pully's Dragoon Division: General of Division Charles Randon de Pully
  - 23rd Dragoon Regiment (4 squadrons)
  - 28th Dragoon Regiment (4 squadrons)
  - 29th Dragoons (4 squadrons)
- Grouchy's Dragoon Division: General of Brigade François Guérin d'Etoquigny
  - 7th Dragoon Regiment (4 squadrons)
  - 30th Dragoon Regiment (4 squadrons)
  - Reine Dragoon Regiment (4 squadrons)

== Austrian Army ==
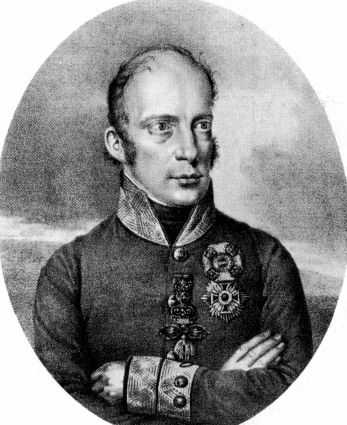
Archduke John

Army of Inner Austria: General der Kavallerie Archduke John of Austria

=== Cavalry and Advance Guard ===
- Artillery: General-Major Anton Reisner
  - Two 12-pound position batteries (12 guns)
- Cavalry Division: Feldmarschall-Leutnant Christian Wolfskehl von Reichenberg †
  - Brigade: General-Major Johann Hager von Altensteig
    - Savoy Dragoon Regiment Nr. 5 (6 squadrons)
    - Hohenlohe Dragoon Regiment Nr. 2 (6 squadrons)
    - One and a half 6-pound cavalry batteries (9 guns)
  - Unattached Cavalry:
    - Archduke Josef Hussar Regiment Nr. 2 (2 squadrons)
  - The following regiments were temporarily attached to Wolfskeel's division.
    - Ott Hussar Regiment Nr. 5 (VIII Armeekorps)
    - Frimont Hussar Regiment Nr. 9 (Advance Guard)

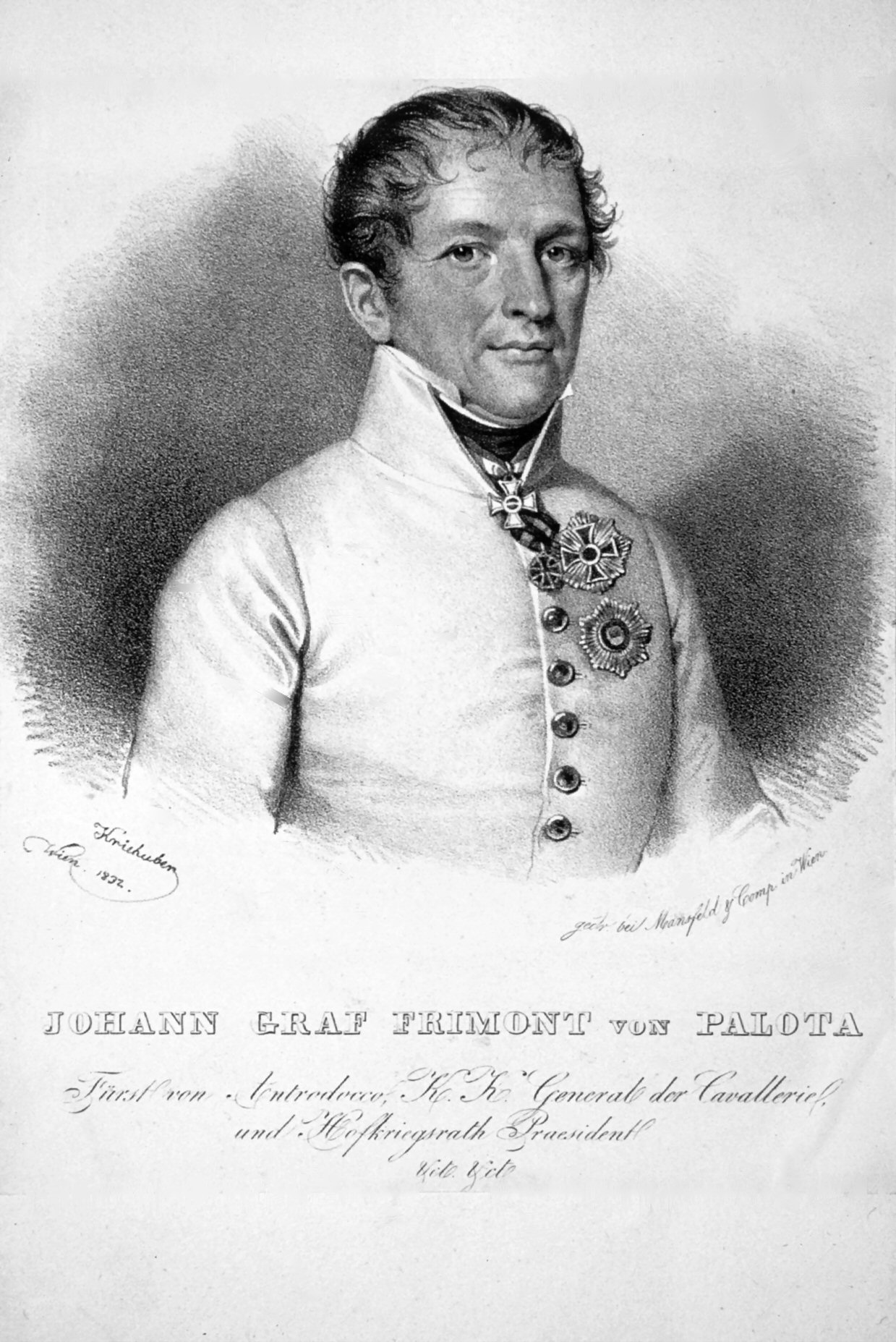
Johann Frimont

- Advance Guard: Feldmarschall-Leutnant Johann Maria Philipp Frimont (4,380, 16 guns)
  - Brigade: General-Major Ignaz Splényi
    - Archduke Franz Karl Infantry Regiment Nr. 52 (3 battalions)
    - Oguliner Grenz Infantry Regiment Nr. 3 (2 battalions)
    - Archduke Josef Hussar Regiment Nr. 2 (6 squadrons)
    - Frimont Hussar Regiment Nr. 9 (7 squadrons)
    - One-half Grenz 3-pound brigade battery (4 guns)
    - Two 6-pound cavalry batteries (12 guns)

=== VIII Armeekorps ===
Feldmarschall-Leutnant Albert Gyulai (7,020, 12 guns)

- Colloredo's Brigade: General-Major Hieronymus Karl Graf von Colloredo-Mansfeld
  - Strassoldo Infantry Regiment Nr. 27 (3 battalions)
  - Saint Julien Infantry Regiment Nr. 61 (3 battalions)
  - 3-pound brigade battery (8 guns)
- Gajoli's Brigade: General-Major Anton Gajoli
  - Franz Jellacic Infantry Regiment Nr. 62 (3 battalions)
  - 1st Banal Grenz Infantry Regiment Nr. 10 (2 battalions)
  - One-half Grenz 3-pound brigade battery (4 guns)
- Detached Cavalry:
  - Ott Hussar Regiment Nr. 5 (8 squadrons)

=== IX Armeekorps ===
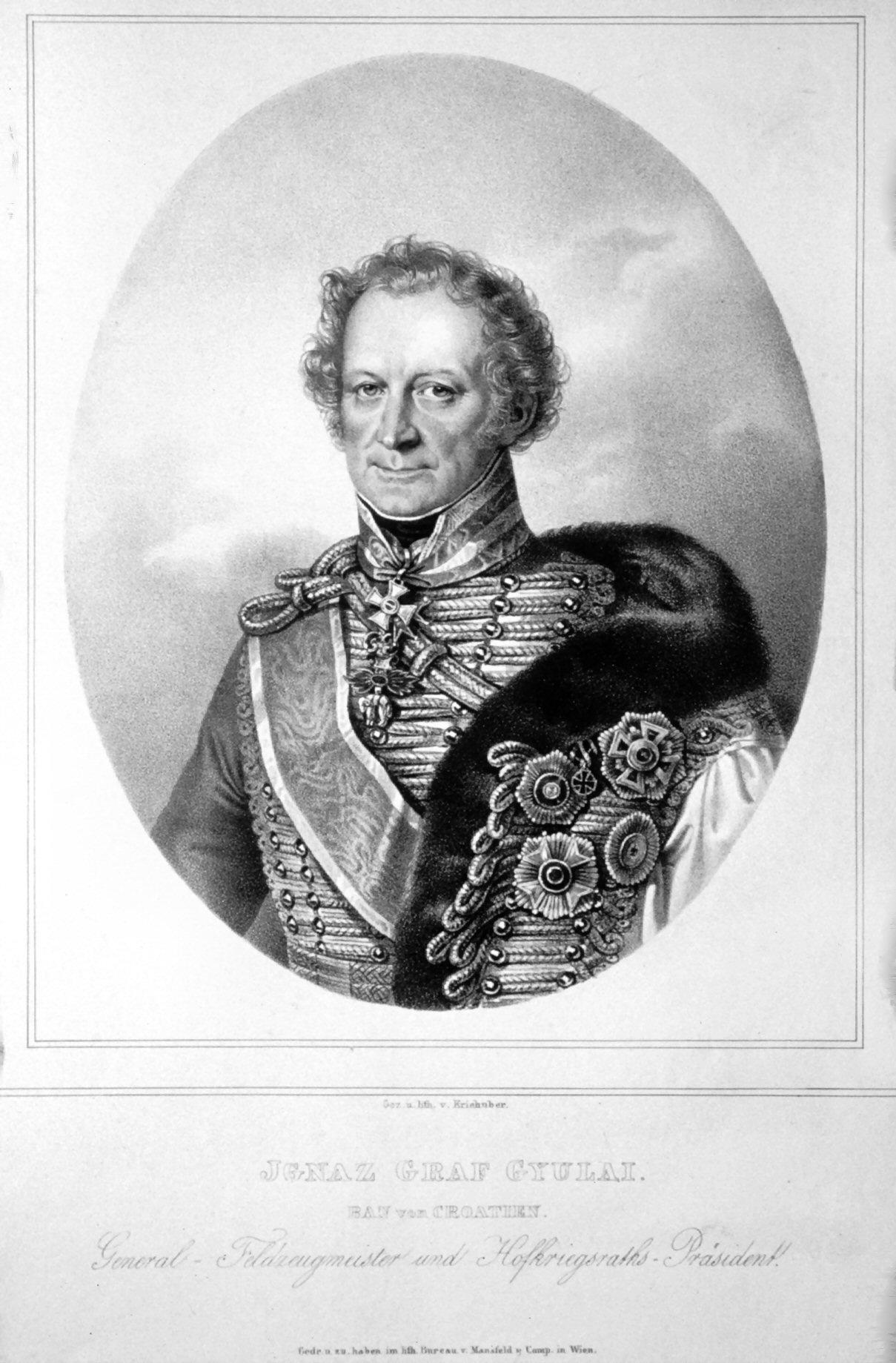
Ignaz Gyulai

Feldmarschall-Leutnant Ignaz Gyulai (12,720, 33 guns)

- Kalnássy's Brigade: General-Major Johann Kalnássy
  - Reisky Infantry Regiment Nr. 13 (3 battalions)
  - Simbschen Infantry Regiment Nr. 43 (3 battalions)
  - 3-pound brigade battery (8 guns)
- Marziani's Brigade: General-Major Franz Marziani
  - Alvinczi Infantry Regiment Nr. 19 (3 battalions)
  - 3-pound brigade battery (8 guns)
- Gavasini's Brigade: General-Major Alois von Gavasini
  - Ottocaner Grenz Infantry Regiment Nr. 2 (2 battalions)
- Kleinmayer's Brigade: General-Major Johann Peter Kleinmayer
  - Szluiner Grenz Infantry Regiment Nr. 4 (2 battalions)
  - 3-pound brigade battery (8 guns)
  - Salamon Grenadier Battalion
  - Janusch Grenadier Battalion
  - Mühlen Grenadier Battalion
  - Chimani Grenadier Battalion
- Sebottendorf's Brigade: General-Major Ignaz Sebottendorf
  - Graz Landwehr (3 battalions)
  - Dumontet Freikorps Battalion
