= Battle of Piave River (1809) =

1809 battle during the War of the Fifth Coalition

- Part of the War of the Fifth Coalition
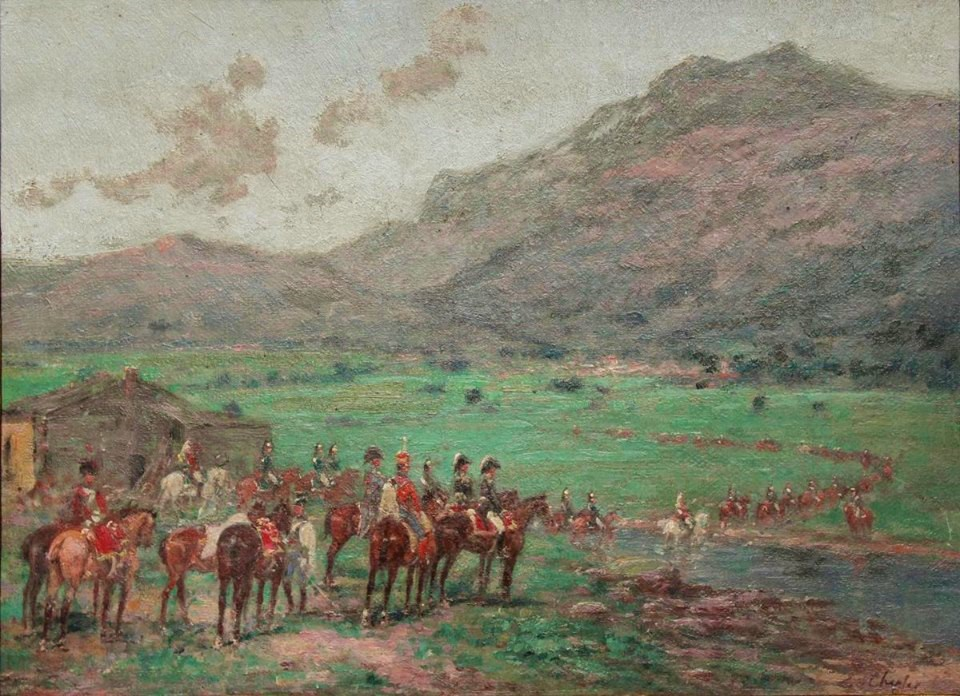
- The French army crossing the Piave in 1809.
Date	8 May 1809
Location	Nervesa della Battaglia, modern-day Italy 45°50′N 12°13′E
Result	Franco-Italian victory

Belligerents
First French Empire (Kingdom of Italy (Napoleonic)) Kingdom of Italy	Austrian Empire

Commanders and leaders
(Kingdom of Italy (Napoleonic)) Eugène de Beauharnais	(Austrian Empire) Archduke John

Strength
44,800 (Note: This source lists 74,760 Franco-Italian troops "engaged" at Piave. This number seems excessive for two reasons. 1) The total includes Rusca's division which was not present according to the authors. 2) Schneid writes that 22,000 infantry and artillery never crossed to the north bank and therefore could not have been engaged, unless they belonged to Sorbier's artillery.)– 45,000	24,120–28,000

Casualties and losses
2,000–3,000	3,600–3,896; 15 guns

War of the Fifth Coalition
current battle
Napoleon in command
Napoleon not in command

The Battle of Piave River was fought on 8 May 1809 between the Franco-Italian army under the command of Eugène de Beauharnais and an Austrian army led by Archduke John of Austria. The Austrian commander made a stand behind the Piave River but he suffered a defeat at the hands of his numerically superior foes. The combat took place near Nervesa della Battaglia, Italy during the War of the Fifth Coalition, part of the Napoleonic Wars.

The initial Austrian invasion of Venetia succeeded in driving the Franco-Italian defenders back to Verona. At the beginning of May, news of Austrian defeats in Bavaria and inferiority in numbers caused Archduke John to begin retreating to the northeast. When he heard that his enemies were crossing the Piave, the Austrian commander turned back to give battle, intending to slow Eugène's pursuit of his army.

Eugène ordered his vanguard across the river early in the morning. It soon ran into vigorous Austrian resistance, but the arrival of French cavalry stabilized the situation by mid-morning. Rapidly rising waters hampered the buildup of French infantry reinforcements and prevented a significant portion of Eugène's army from crossing at all. In the late afternoon, Eugène launched his main attack which turned John's left flank and finally overran his main line of defense. Damaged but not destroyed, the Austrians continued their withdrawal into Carinthia (in modern-day Austria) and Carniola (in modern-day Slovenia).

== Background ==
At the beginning of the 1809 conflict between the Austrian Empire and the First French Empire, General of Cavalry Archduke John led his Army of Inner Austria in an invasion of northeastern Italy. Emperor Napoleon I appointed his stepson Eugène to be Viceroy of Italy and commander of the Army of Italy. On 16 April, John defeated Eugène at the Battle of Sacile near the Livenza River. During this time an Austrian force led by Feldmarschall-Leutnant Johann Gabriel Chasteler de Courcelles advanced south from the Tyrol, capturing Trento on 23 April and Roveredo on 26 April. In the face of these two threats, Eugène's Franco-Italian army withdrew 130 kilometres (81 mi) from Sacile to the Adige River.

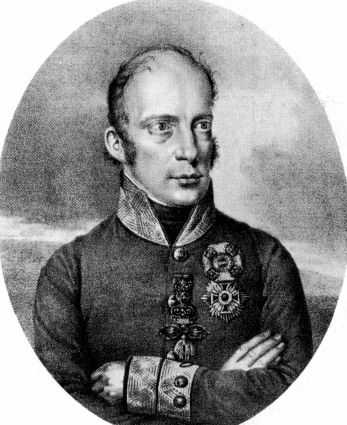
Archduke John

Once the Franco-Italian army arrived near Verona it gathered reinforcements. Eugène also reorganized his army, assigning Generals of Division Jacques MacDonald, Paul Grenier, and Louis Baraguey d'Hilliers to command his infantry corps, and General of Division Emmanuel Grouchy to lead his cavalry. Baraguey d'Hilliers halted Chasteler's drive in the upper Adige valley. Because Archduke John sent a division to blockade Venice, his army arrived on the Adige with only about 30,000 troops, much fewer than Eugène. Napoleon's victory in the Battle of Eckmühl and the subsequent retreat of Archduke Charles, caused Emperor Francis II to order John to fall back and defend Austria. Anticipating an Austrian withdrawal, Eugène created a Light Brigade consisting of three voltigeur battalions, a squadron of light cavalry, and two cannon. The voltigeur units were formed by taking the skirmisher companies from infantry battalions. Eugène placed this pursuit force under General of Brigade Armand Louis Debroc.

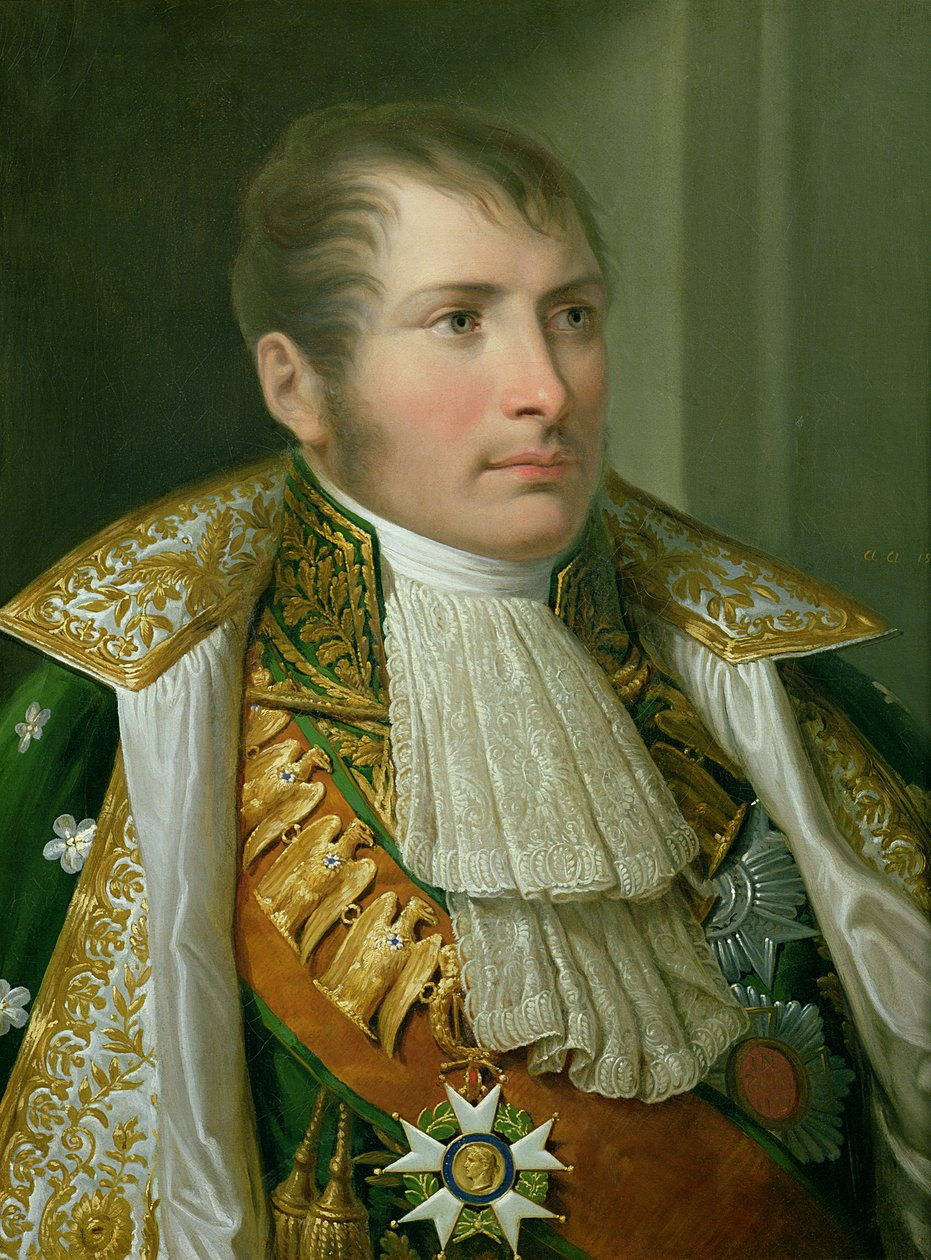
Eugène de Beauharnais

Archduke John deployed his right flank behind the small Alpone River between Soave and Albaredo d'Adige, near the old Arcole battlefield, while his left flank defended the Adige south to Legnago. In a series of clashes between 27 and 30 April, John successfully fended off Eugène's efforts to turn his north flank in the Battle of Caldiero. Austrian losses numbered 700 killed and wounded, plus 872 captured or missing. The French suffered about 1,400 casualties.

On 1 May, Archduke John ordered his army to withdraw to the east. In several clashes on 2 May, the Austrian rear guard held off the French, inflicting 400 killed and wounded including Debroc wounded. Austrian losses were only 200 killed and wounded, but the French rounded up an additional 850 stragglers and sick. The Austrians paused on the Brenta River until 5 May, then continued retreating to the Piave. Eugène followed while sending the division of General of Division Pierre François Joseph Durutte along a more southerly route in order to relieve the blockade of Venice. When he reached that city, Durutte was reinforced by 4,000 troops from the garrison and marched to join Eugène on the Piave. The Light Brigade having proved too weak to pursue effectively, Eugène strengthened it into a Light Division by adding three additional voltigeur battalions, attaching an entire cavalry regiment, and boosting its artillery complement to four cannons. Replacing Debroc, the French army commander gave the Light Division to General of Brigade Joseph Marie, Count Dessaix.

On 7 May, the Austrian army camped at Conegliano, 8 kilometres (5.0 mi) northeast of the river, after burning all the bridges. Eugène's cavalry reached the riverbank and scouted the crossing places. The 8th Chasseurs crossed to the east bank and did some reconnoitering. Receiving notice that the French were nearby, John marched his troops back to defend the river line.

== Prelude ==
The Piave River 1809 Order of Battle lists the units and organization of the Franco-Italian and Austrian armies in detail.

=== Forces ===
MacDonald's corps consisted of two French infantry divisions, those of Generals of Division Jean-Baptiste Broussier and Jean Maximilien Lamarque. Grenier's corps included the French infantry divisions of Durutte and General of Brigade Louis Abbé. Louis Baraguey d'Hilliers only had General of Division Achille Fontanelli's Italian infantry division available. His other Franco-Italian division under General of Division Jean-Baptiste Dominique Rusca was detached. Grouchy's cavalry reserve included General of Division Louis Michel Antoine Sahuc's light cavalry division, General of Division Charles Randon de Pully's dragoon division, and Grouchy's own dragoon division which was led by General of Brigade François Guérin d'Etoquigny. In addition to Dessaix's Advance Guard, Eugène held three units in reserve under his personal command. These were General of Division Jean-Barthélemot Sorbier's reserve artillery, General of Division Jean Mathieu Seras' French infantry division, and General of Brigade Teodoro Lecchi's 2,500-man Italian Guard.

Feldmarschall-Leutnant Albert Gyulai's VIII Armeekorps was made up of the infantry brigades of Generalmajors Hieronymus Karl Graf von Colloredo-Mansfeld and Anton Gajoli. Albert's brother Feldmarschall-Leutnant Ignaz Gyulai commanded the larger IX Armeekorps. This formation included the infantry brigades of Generalmajors Johann Kalnássy, Franz Marziani, Alois von Gavasini, Johann Peter Kleinmayer, and Ignaz Sebottendorf. Frimont's Advance Guard counted only the brigade of Generalmajor Ignaz Splényi. (Note: Smith added Sebottendorf's brigade, which is not mentioned by Schneid or Bowden & Tarbox.) John massed most of his horsemen into an ad hoc cavalry division and placed it under the command of Feldmarschall-Leutnant Christian Wolfskehl von Reichenberg with Generalmajor Johann Hager von Altensteig as his second in command. Generalmajor Anton Reisner's reserve artillery numbered 12 pieces in two 12-pound position batteries. (Note: This source lists one 12-pdr position battery for each armeekorps at the outbreak of hostilities, but none for Piave. It is possible these two batteries were present at the Piave.)

=== Geography ===
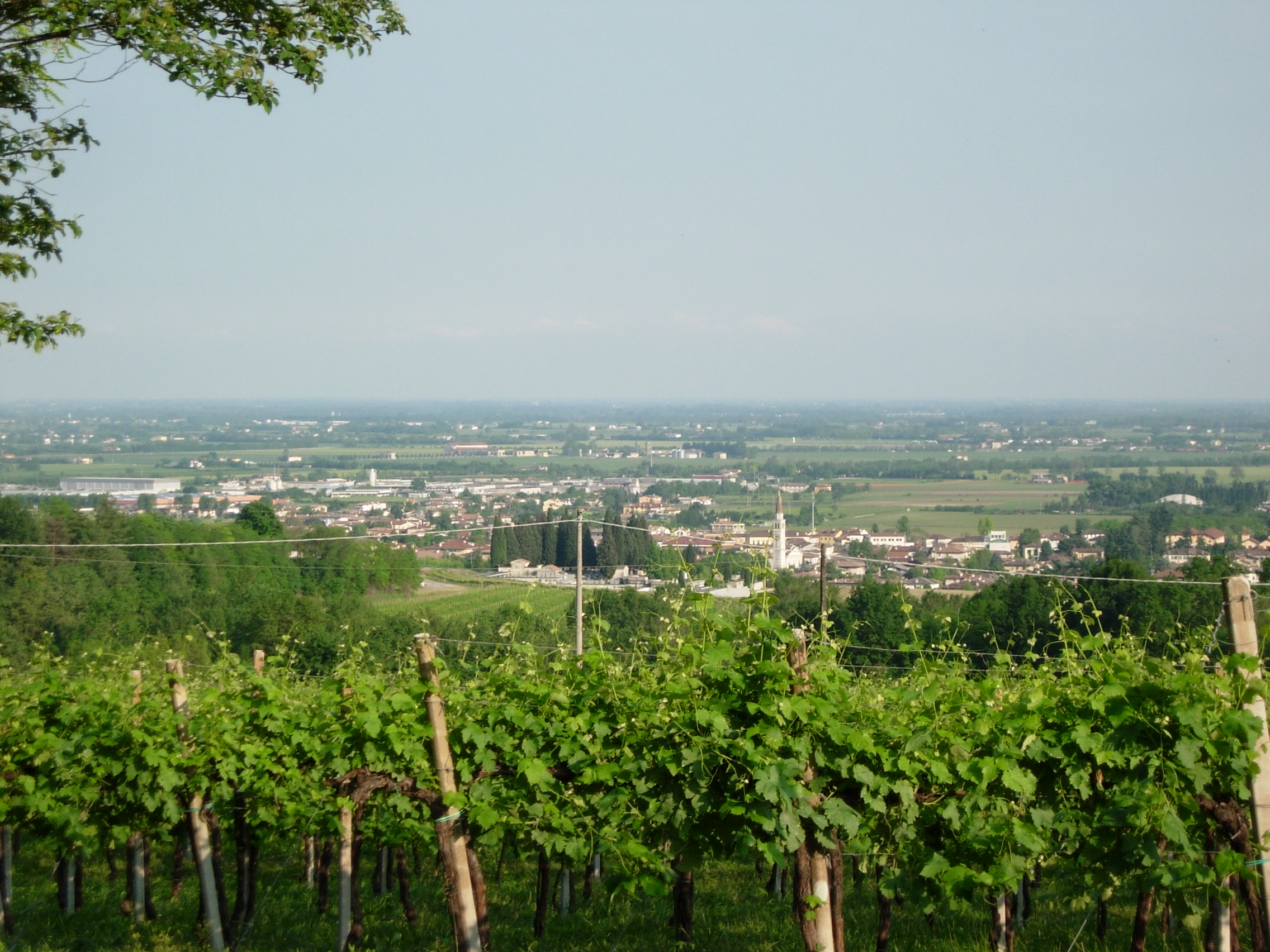
Susegana from the hills

Eugène's cavalry found three places to ford the Piave, at Nervesa on the north flank, at Priula in the center, and at San Nichiol, near Cimadolmo on the south flank. The area between Conegliano and the Piave is flat, but just to the north of Nervesa and Conegliano the terrain becomes hilly. (Note: This observation can be confirmed by referring to Google Earth.)

Most of the villages in Gunther E. Rothenberg's maps of the battle can be located on modern maps. However, since 1809 a few places either changed names, moved to a new location, vanished due to the river's action, or were destroyed in the Battle of the Piave River in 1918. The changes are listed as follows. Susignano is now called Susegana. Santa Maria is near the Rothenberg map location of Campana. Ponte della Priula appears to have moved from its map position to a place 3 kilometres (1.9 mi) northwest, closer to Nervesa. San Nichiol has disappeared. (Note: The Rothenberg maps were compared to Google Earth.) In 1809 a stream or canal known as the Piavisella began near Barco and ran west to east through Mandre, Santa Maria (Campana), and Tezze di Piave before turning northeast. A dike ran east and west about 800 meters south of the Piavisella. Both the dike and stream played important parts in the battle. (Note: Neither the dike nor stream can be accurately located on modern satellite images.) Two nearby canals known as the Piavesella and Piavesella di Maserada lie on the south bank of the Piave, while the Piavisella of the 1809 battle is located on the north bank.

== Battle ==
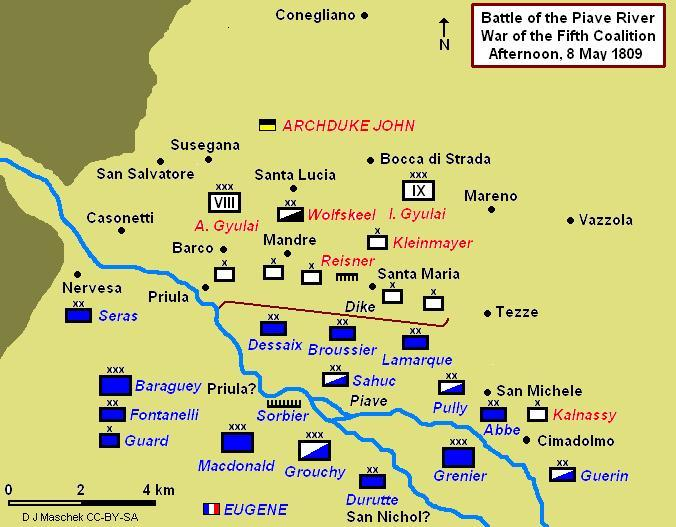
Battle of Piave showing afternoon positions

Believing that the bulk of Archduke John's army lay at Conegliano, Eugène planned an ambitious assault crossing of the Piave. He did not realize that the Army of Inner Austria was deployed only 4 kilometres (2.5 mi) north of the river. In fact, Albert Gyulai's VIII Armeekorps was ranged between Susegana and Santa Lucia di Piave, while Ignaz Gyulai had the IX Armeekorps in line between Santa Lucia and Bocca di Strada just to the east. Eugène greatly outnumbered John, who had between 24,120 and 28,000 troops at the Piave.

Understanding that his defeat at Sacile was caused by poor preparation, Eugène made sure that he had most of his army assembled. He planned to feint at the Nervesa ford with Seras' Reserve division while Dessaix's Light Division (Advance Guard) led the main attack at the Priula ford. He ordered Grouchy to cross with three divisions of cavalry at the San Nichiol crossing and swing left to help Dessaix's effort. To provide the Light Division sufficient fire support, Eugène massed several batteries on the south bank and placed them under the command of his artillery chief Sorbier. If Dessaix successfully carved out a bridgehead, Eugène planned to send the corps of MacDonald and Baraguey d'Hilliers across the Piave. Grenier's corps waited at San Nichiol to follow Grouchy's cavalry.

At 7:00 AM, Dessaix crossed the river with nearly 5,000 troops. By this time, Archduke John's army was moving up behind the Piavisella stream, much closer than Eugène realized. The archduke posted the VIII Armeekorps on the west flank with Frimont's infantry, while the IX Armeekorps defended the east flank. (Note: This information is deduced from Rothenberg's battle maps.) By 8:00 AM the Light Division was 400 meters south of the dike. Having massed virtually all his cavalry under Wolfskeel, he sent them charging at Dessaix's men. The French general reformed his soldiers into two large squares and repelled wave after wave of enemy horsemen. As Wolfskeel's disorganized troopers withdrew, a massed battery of 24 Austrian guns opened fire on the French.

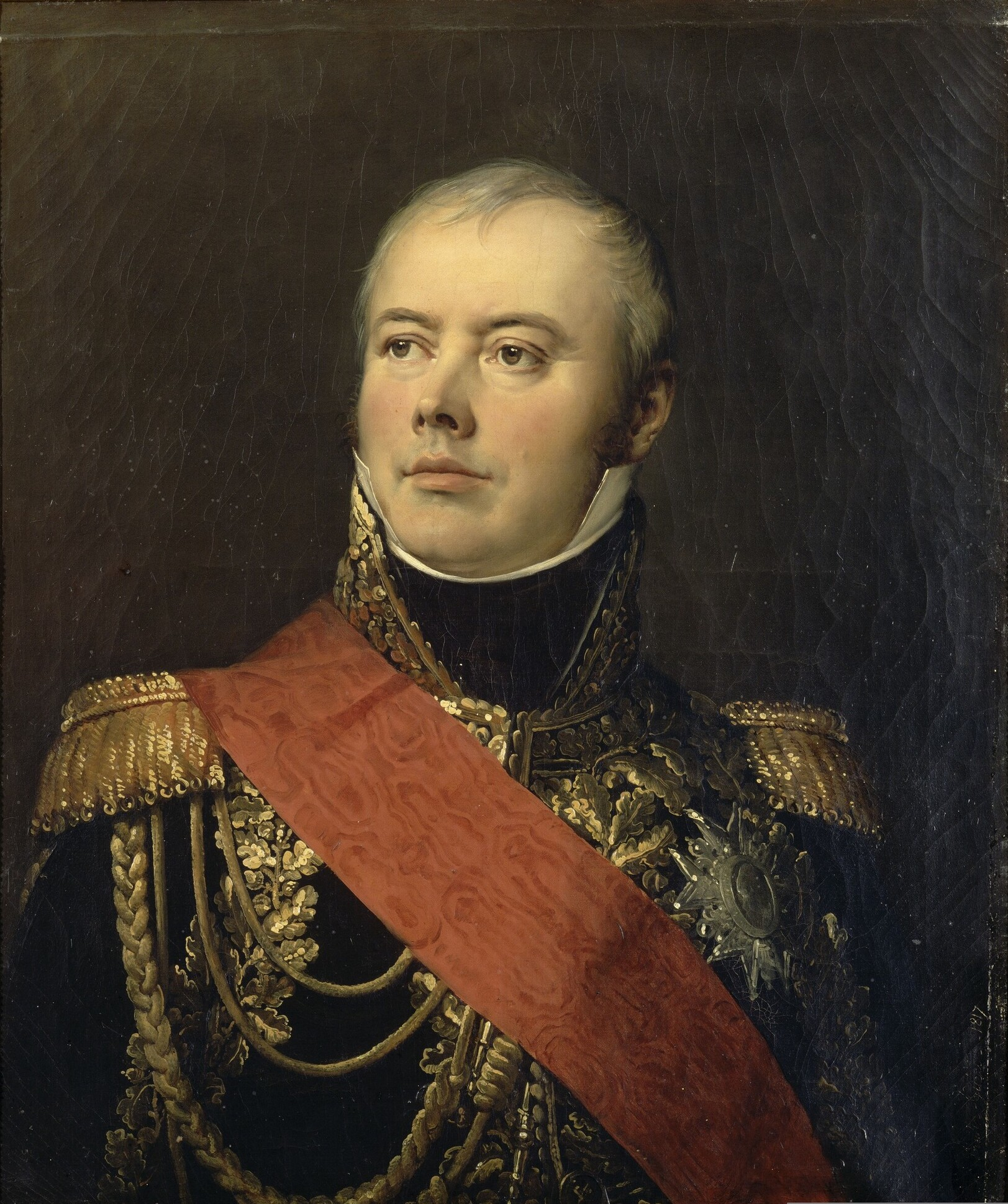
Jacques MacDonald

Deployed 800 yards from the French, these cannons were commanded by Reisner, Archduke John's chief of artillery. The artillery barrage soon caused serious casualties in the vulnerable French squares. As some French troops began to shrink from the heavy fire, couriers raced off to get help. Quickly, Eugène ordered twenty guns belonging to Broussier and Lamarque across the river. When the cannons arrived, the French formed their own 24-gun battery in front of the infantry and replied to Reisner's bombardment. Wolfskeel asked for some infantry to be sent forward from the Piavisella line, but for some reason no help arrived.

While Dessaix and Wolfskeel battled, Grouchy sent the divisions of Pully and Sahuc across the Piave at San Nichiol. The troopers encountered Kalnássy's IX Armeekorps brigade in the open and hustled the Austrians back to Cimadolmo and San Michele, where they took up a strong defensive position. Guérin d'Etoquigny's division crossed around 9:00 AM, allowing the other two divisions to move to the left in support of Dessaix. By this time, the French artillery fire began to slacken. In their haste to help Dessaix, the French gunners had left their reserve ammunition behind.

There are two accounts about what happened next. Having reorganized his horsemen, Wolfskeel returned to the attack around 10:00 AM. The Austrian cavalry trotted toward Dessaix's men in three lines. This time Sahuc's light horse and Pully's dragoons were waiting for them. The two French divisions countercharged, and the cavalry of both armies became embroiled in a terrific melee.

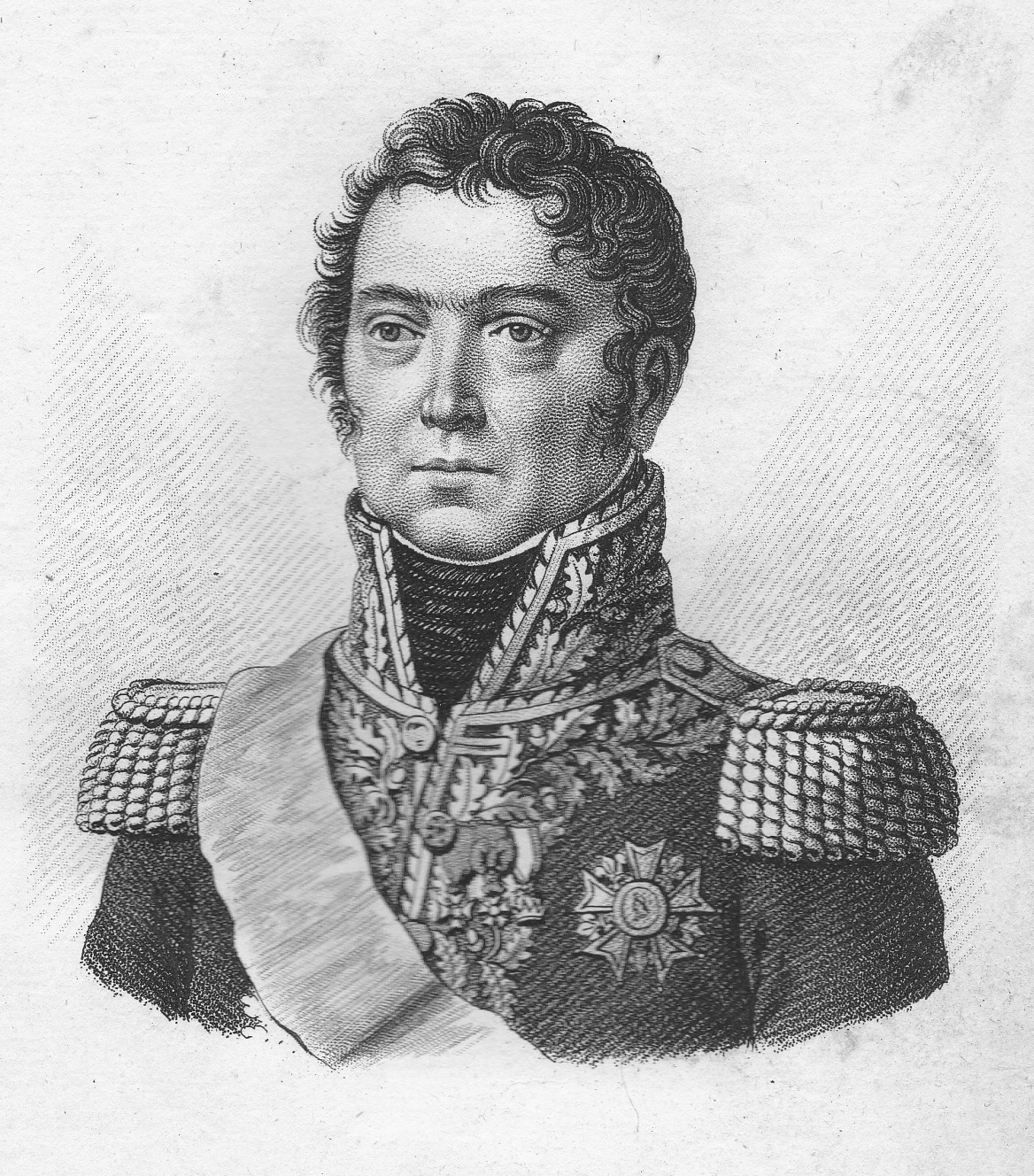
Paul Grenier

A second account states that the French cavalry attacked first. Eugène sent Pully and Sahuc charging at the Austrian guns in a pincer attack. Under cover of the smoke from the two artilleries blasting away at each other, the French divisions struck Reisner's gun line from both flanks. While some horsemen began cutting down the gunners, the others galloped among the Austrian cavalry which was formed up behind the guns.

The results of the cavalry action are not disputed. A French dragoon killed Wolfskeel in personal combat, while his second-in-command Hager became a prisoner. Leaderless and outnumbered, the Austrian horsemen broke and fled. The Austrians brought away ten cannons but 14 cannons were captured by their enemies. During the struggle Reisner was wounded and captured. Both Epstein and Arnold reported that Reisner was killed, but that is incorrect. Reisner lived until 1822.

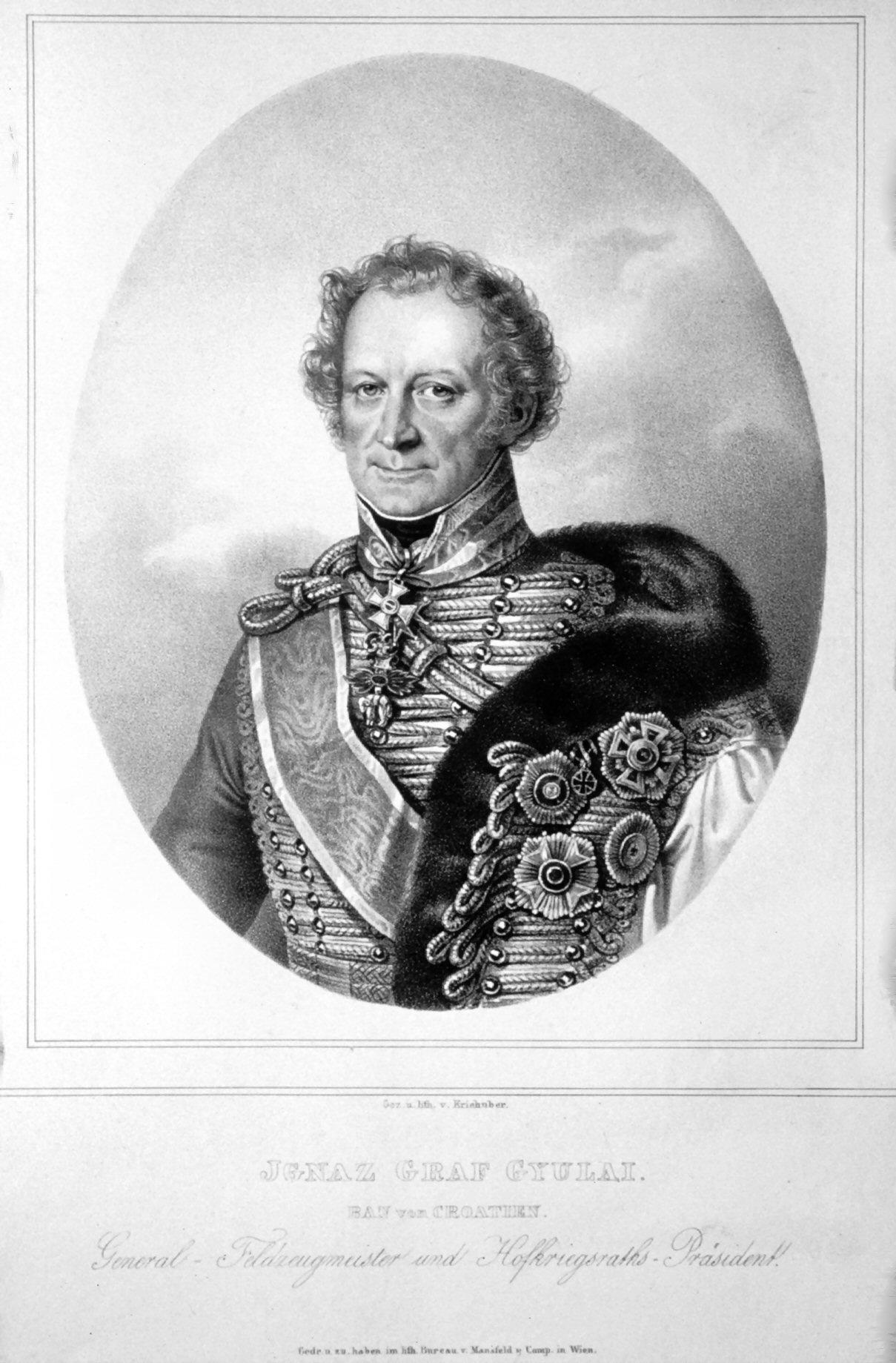
Ignaz Gyulai

The French cavalry pursued the routed Austrian troopers as far as Mandra and Santa Maria (Campana), where they came upon the brigades of Colloredo and Gajoli. Pully's troopers tried to break the Austrian infantry squares but they were unsuccessful. Unable to dent the Austrian line without support, the French horsemen fell back to the dike where they were joined by Dessaix's troops. Though the Piave began an alarming rise at this time, Eugène hewed to his plan of reinforcing the bridgehead. Around noon, MacDonald pushed three-quarters of Broussier's division and half of Lamarque's division across the river. While MacDonald began probing the Piavisella line, Grenier got part of Abbé's division across the river at San Nichiol.

With Eugène trying to get more troops across the Piave before it drowned the fords and Archduke John organizing his defenses, the fighting died down after 1:00 PM. By 3:00 PM Eugène had to suspend all troop crossings because of dangerous high water conditions. By this time, all his cavalry and only half his infantry reached the north bank, with Baraguey d'Hilliers, Seras' division, the Italian Guard, and part of Durutte's division remaining on the south bank. If the battle turned against the French, they would be trapped with an unfordable river at their backs. But with the bulk of his badly shaken and outnumbered horsemen still rallying in the rear, Archduke John elected not to expose his foot soldiers to cavalry attack by ordering them forward.

By this time, there were approximately 27,000 to 30,000 Franco-Italian troops in the bridgehead. Assembling the available troops, Eugène planned to hurl MacDonald's corps, elements of Durutte's division, and Sahuc's division at the Piavisella line. Off to the right, the viceroy ordered Grenier to pin the left wing of IX Armeekorps at San Michele and Cimadolmo with Pully's and Guérin's cavalry and Abbé's infantry. The French attack got rolling in the late afternoon. Abbé's advance was counterattacked by squadrons of the Archduke Josef Hussar Regiment, the last unbroken Austrian horsemen on the field. Pully and Guérin quickly repulsed the gallant Austrian riposte and Kalnássy evacuated San Michele and Cimadolmo before Grenier's pressure. Kalnássy fell back to Tezze where he sturdily held his ground until evening, suffering 1,200 casualties during the battle.

MacDonald's attack was preceded by a bombardment from 24 guns. His attack breached the IX Armeekorps line and John was forced to commit his last reserve, Kleinmayer's grenadier brigade. These elite troops attacked, but were unable to halt MacDonald's offensive. On the left flank, Dessaix and Sahuc seized Barco while Macdonald took Santa Maria (Campana) and drove toward Bocca di Strada. On the right, Grenier finally dislodged Kalnássy from Tezze and let loose his two dragoon divisions. John's army finally broke and streamed north into Conegliano. As darkness fell, Eugène suspended the pursuit on a line from Vazzola to Susegana.

== Aftermath ==
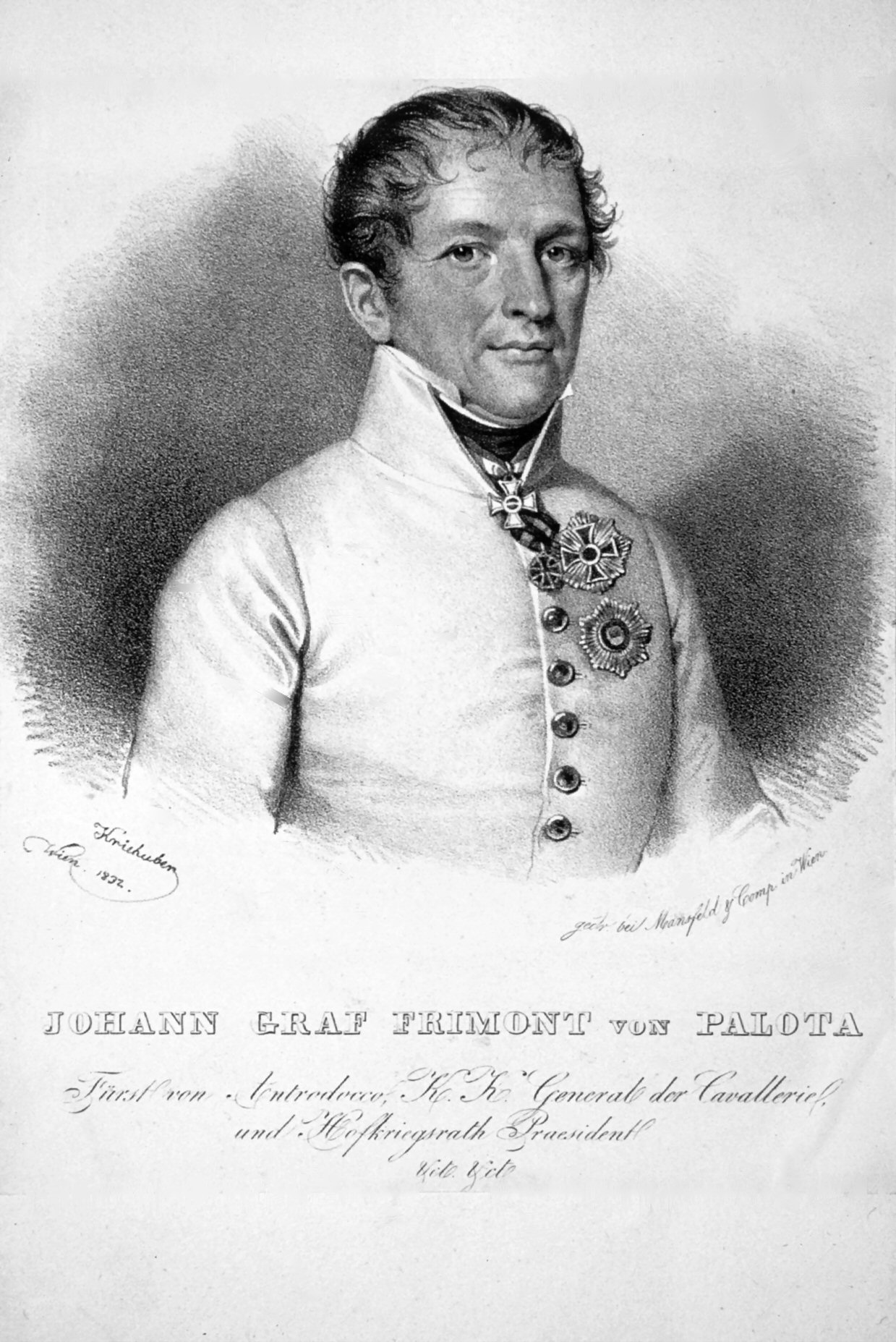
Johann Frimont

Archduke John retreated to Conegliano that night and soon had his troops on the road for Sacile. He managed the retrograde movement well. Eugène halted his advance at Bocca di Strada, deciding to wait until he could reunite his army. The French admitted only 700 casualties, but 2,000 is a more likely figure. The Austrians suffered 3,896 casualties, including 398 killed, 697 wounded, 1,681 captured, and 1,120 missing. The French captured 15 artillery pieces. The dead included Wolfskeel. On the extreme south flank, Kalnássy's brigade became separated from John's army and Grouchy's cavalry prevented him from rejoining John. Kalnássy rendezvoused with Feldmarschall-Leutnant Anton von Zach near Palmanova and the two retreated independently toward Ljubljana (Laibach).

At Sacile, Archduke John made a serious blunder. He split his army into two parts, sending Ignaz Gyulai with most of the IX Armeekorps east to Ljubljana in Carniola and the VIII Armeekorps northeast to Villach in Carinthia. This dispersal of available Austrian troops facilitated Eugène's advance from Italy into the Austrian Empire. One authority wrote, "From the Piave to Hungary John's handling of the campaign was a failure." Frimont, who led John's rearguard made a stand at San Daniele del Friuli on 11 May with 4,000 soldiers. Eugène and Dessaix carried out a double envelopment and inflicted about 2,000 casualties on their opponents. Franco-Italian losses were 200 to 800. Despite this defeat, Frimont kept his rear guard intact and maintained its effectiveness.

The next major action was the Battle of Tarvis from 15 to 18 May. The engagement included two actions where small garrisons of Grenz infantry heroically defended two blockhouses against overwhelming Franco-Italian forces. This was followed by an Austrian disaster at the Battle of Sankt Michael on 25 May. Eugène pursued John into Hungary where he defeated him at the Battle of Raab on 14 June before joining Napoleon at the Battle of Wagram on 5 and 6 July. The last action of note in the theater was the Battle of Graz from 24 to 26 June.

== Notes ==
Preceded by Third siege of Girona	Napoleonic Wars; Battle of Piave River (1809)	Succeeded by Battle of Grijó
