= Wolfskehl =

Wolfskehl is a surname. Notable people with the surname include:

- Christian Wolfskehl von Reichenberg (1761–1809), a talented cavalry officer
- Karl Wolfskehl (1869–1948), a Jewish-German author
- Paul Wolfskehl (1856–1906), a German mathematician
