= Alois von Gavasini =

Austrian general

- Born: 1762; Bonn, Electorate of Cologne
- Died: 28 November 1834 (aged 71–72) Klagenfurt, Austrian Empire
- Allegiance: Habsburg monarchy Austrian Empire
- Branch: Infantry
- Rank: Generalmajor
- Conflicts: French Revolutionary Wars; Battle of Primolano; Battle of Arcole; Battle of Hohenlinden; Napoleonic Wars; Battle of Caldiero; Battle of Sacile; Battle of Piave River; Battle of Graz
- Awards: Military Order of Maria Theresa

Alois Graf von Gavasini (1762 – 28 November 1834) led a combat brigade in the armies of Habsburg Austria and the Austrian Empire during a remarkable number of battles in the French Revolutionary Wars and Napoleonic Wars. A native of Bonn, he offered his services to Austria and won an award for bravery in 1790. While a field officer in the Italian campaign, he led the rear guard at Primolano in September 1796. Badly outnumbered by the French, he and his soldiers put up a vigorous fight until he was wounded and captured. At Arcole in November 1796, he commanded a brigade on the field of battle against Napoleon Bonaparte's French army. Promoted to general officer in the spring of 1800, he led a powerful brigade at Hohenlinden during that year's fall campaign in Bavaria. Though the battle ended in a decisive defeat, Gavasini's troops fought well before being forced to retreat. The 1805 campaign in Italy found him directing a reserve brigade at Caldiero. After briefly retiring, the warrior returned to lead a brigade at the battles of Sacile, Piave River, and Graz during the 1809 war. That year he retired from the army and did not return.

== French Revolutionary Wars ==
=== Primolano ===
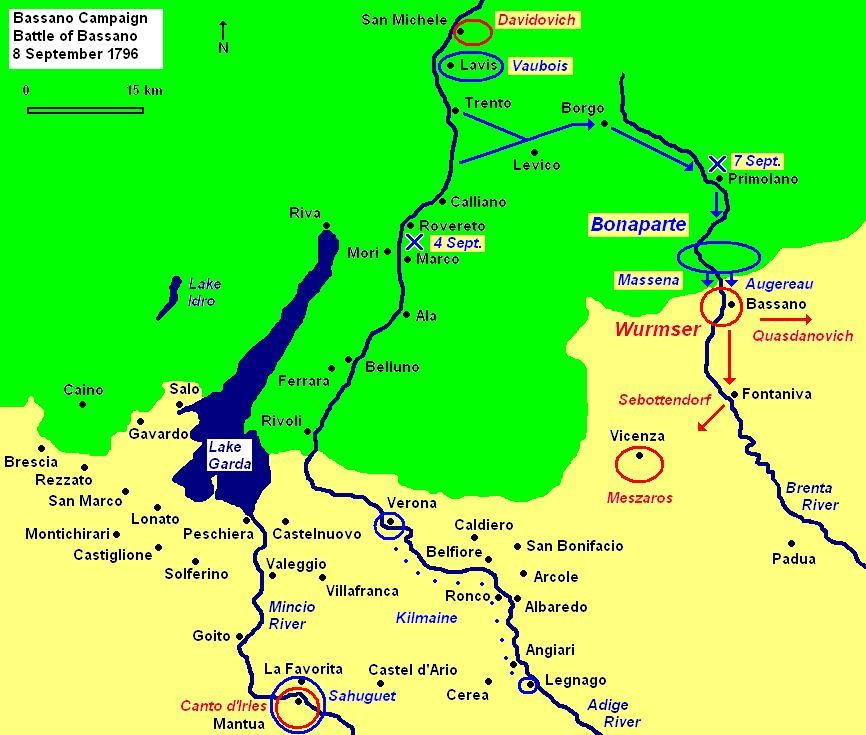
Map showing the action at Primolano (upper right) on 7 September 1796

Born in 1762 at Bonn in the Electorate of Cologne, Gavasini joined the army of Habsburg Austria. He won the Knight's Cross of the Military Order of Maria Theresa on 19 December 1790. It is not specified whether the award was given for fighting against the Ottoman Turks or the Brabant Revolution. By September 1793, he had risen to the rank of Major. His next promotion was to Oberstleutnant (lieutenant colonel) on 1 April 1796.

In September 1796, Dagobert Sigmund von Wurmser's army descended the Brenta Valley as it marched from Trentino in the Italian Tyrol to Bassano del Grappa in the Po Valley. Peter Quasdanovich, who led a division, dropped off Gavasini with a rear guard at Primolano near Cismon del Grappa to hold off Pierre Augereau's French pursuit. Gavasini's command included one 1,108-man battalion of the Michael Wallis Infantry Regiment Nr. 11, 561 soldiers in four companies of the Erbach Infantry Regiment Nr. 42, one 100-strong company of the Mahony Jägers, a half-company of pioneers, and 90 troopers of the Erdödy Hussar Regiment Nr. 9. Another column of troops under Oberst Georg von Stentsch arrived, bringing the total number of troops available to about 2,800. Gavasini drew up his troops behind an entrenchment in a narrow valley with a loop of the Brenta partly protecting his front.

On 7 September, Augereau's division appeared and began attacking the Austrian defenses. After clambering over the ridges and wading the river, the French skirmishers soon put the Austrian position in peril. The 5th Light and the 4th Line Infantry Demi-Brigades soon forced Gavasini to pull back to the Covelo fort, which perched atop an outcrop 200 feet (61 m) high. The 5th Light circled the Austrian left flank, while a strong party of the 4th Line climbed to a site on the Austrian right rear where it poured fire into the fort. After holding out for an hour, the wounded Gavasini led his men out of the trap only to fall captive to Édouard Jean Baptiste Milhaud's 5th Dragoon Regiment.

Against "light" French casualties, the Austrians lost 1,500 men and five guns captured in the combat, including the greater part of the Wallis and Erbach battalions. Austrian total strength in the area was 4,000, including the 9th Battalion of the Karlstadt Grenz Infantry Regiment, the 4th Battalion of the Warasdiner Grenz Infantry Regiment, and the grenadiers of the Pellegrini Infantry Regiment Nr. 49. Augereau's 8,200-man division consisted of twelve battalions in two brigades under Jean-Baptiste Dominique Rusca and Claude Perrin Victor. The Battle of Bassano occurred the following day.

=== Arcole ===
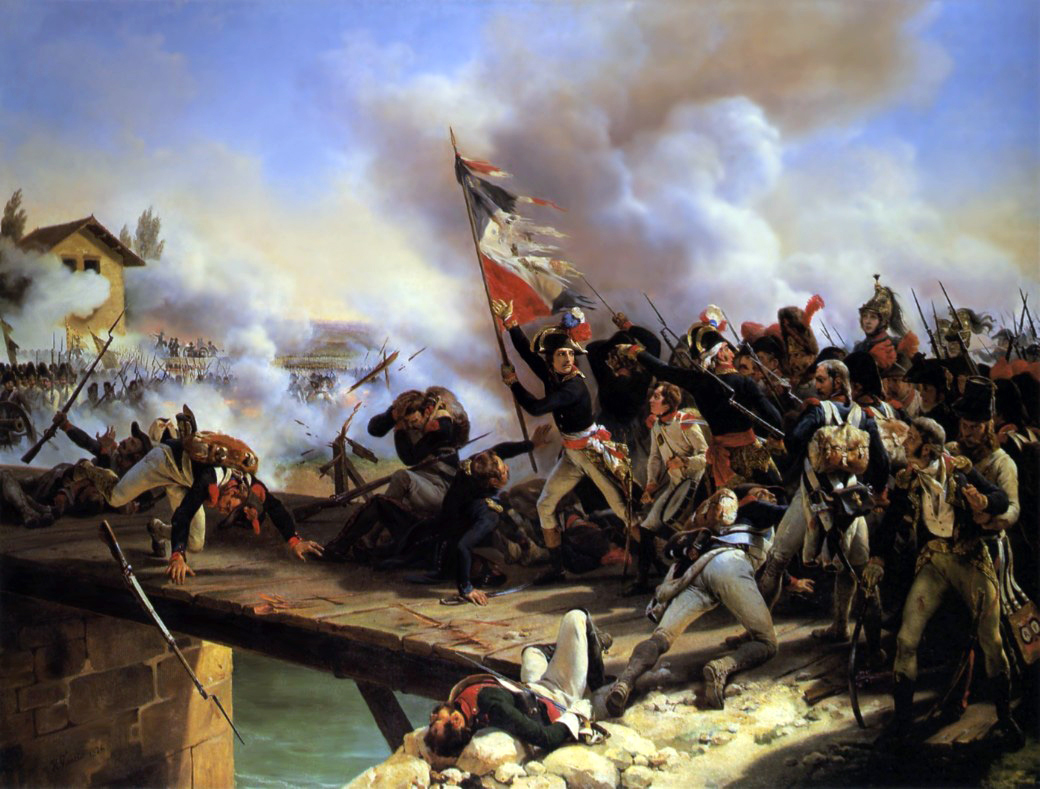
The Crossing of the Arcole Bridge by Horace Vernet, 1826. Fanciful painting by Vernet showing Bonaparte leading his troops across the Arcole bridge

After being freed in a prisoner exchange, Gavasini rejoined the army for the third relief of the Siege of Mantua. His name does not appear in the Austrian order of battle, which lists six divisions of about 4,000 men each. On the morning of 15 November 1796, the French army of Napoleon Bonaparte initiated the Battle of Arcole by crossing the Adige River behind Jozsef Alvinczi's left flank. From there, Augereau's division drove north toward Arcole village while André Masséna's division moved northwest in the direction of Belfiore. In response to orders from Alvinczi, Gavasini moved his brigade to Belfiore at 11:00 AM. Leading the Splényi Infantry Regiment Nr. 51 along a causeway through the marshes, Gavasini ran into Masséna's advance at Bionde, midway between Belfiore and the French crossing site at Ronco all'Adige. At first the Splényi Regiment drove back the French, capturing two cannons. However, a second Austrian column under Adolf Brabeck mistakenly fired into Gavasini's men from an adjacent causeway, throwing them into panic. Masséna followed the retreating Austrians and temporarily captured Belfiore.

On the second day of battle, Alvinczi ordered six battalions under Giovanni Marchese di Provera to advance from Belfiore while Anton Ferdinand Mittrowsky's 14 battalions attacked south from Arcole. At 5:00 AM, Provera's attack was underway, but it was quickly blunted by Masséna. The French skirmishers riddled the Austrian infantry formations and soon only the Habsburg cannoneers were holding back the enemy almost singlehandedly. Then Brabeck was killed and the entire force fled back to Belfiore, which the French captured again, along with five guns. Mittrowsky's attack also miscarried, but he managed to hang onto Arcole until nightfall after savage fighting. On the third day, Provera's attack on Masséna failed again and this time the Austrian position unraveled. The French general diverted the bulk of his division to help Augereau and the two finally seized Arcole about 5:00 PM on 17 November, thereby winning the battle.

=== Hohenlinden ===
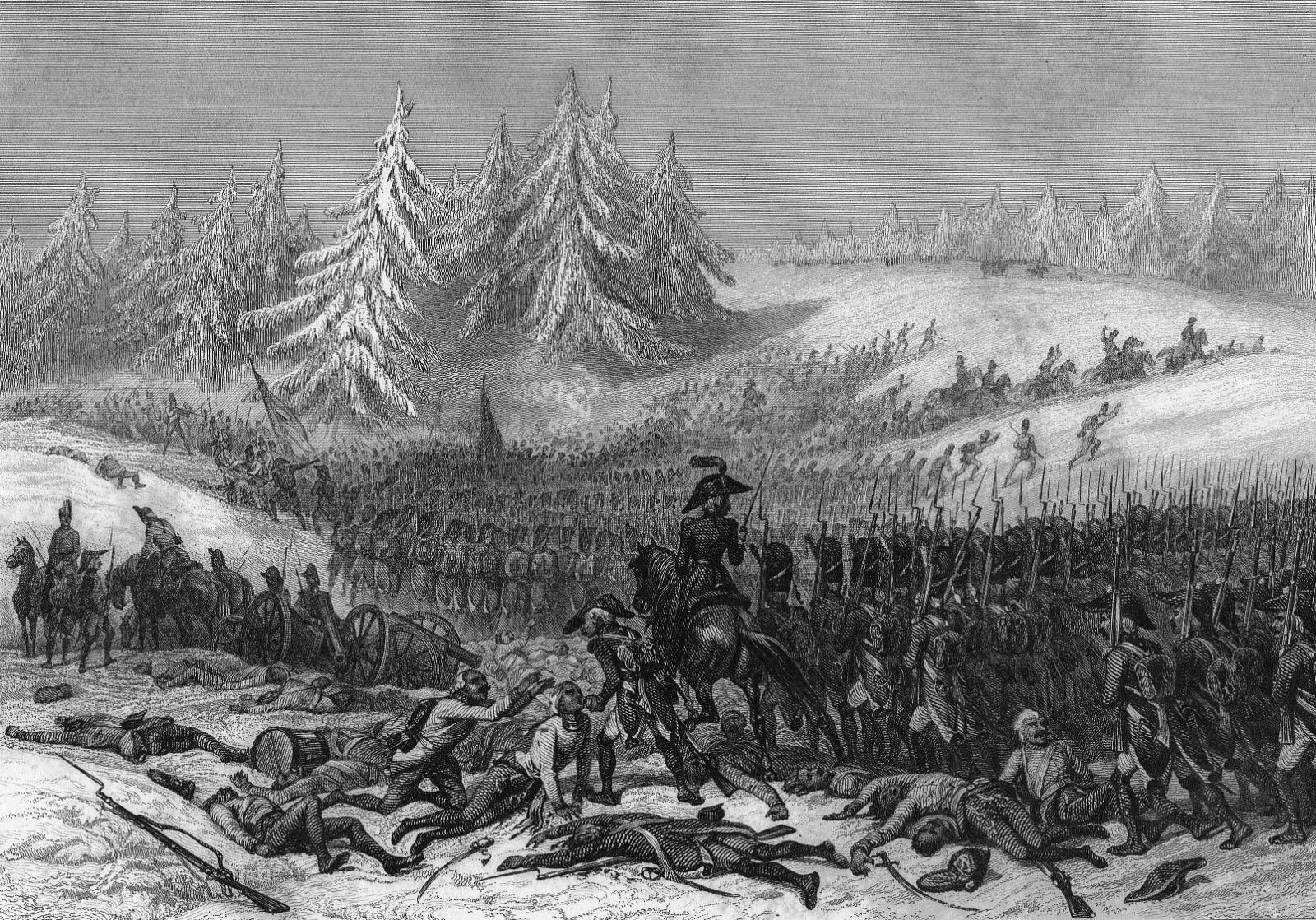
Battle of Hohenlinden

Gavasini was promoted to Oberst (colonel) on 4 December 1796 and to General-major on 6 March 1800. On 3 December 1800 he led a brigade in Michael von Kienmayer's corps-sized Right Column at the Battle of Hohenlinden. His brigade was part of Karl Philipp, Prince of Schwarzenberg's division and comprised one battalion of the Ligne Infantry Regiment Nr. 30; two battalions each of the Clerfayt Infantry Regiment Nr. 9, Beaulieu Infantry Regiment Nr. 58, and Murray Infantry Regiment Nr. 55; and three battalions of the Gemmingen Infantry Regiment Nr. 21. The battle ended in an Austrian disaster, but alone among his fellow division and column commanders, Schwarzenberg handled his division with skill.

While some Austrian leaders proved irresolute, Schwarzenberg thrust boldly at Paul Grenier's left wing divisions of Louis Bastoul and Michel Ney. Gavasini's Gemmingen Regiment quickly seized the village of Forstern and had to be driven out. Schwarzenberg's fight centered on a series of hamlets north of Hohenlinden. The Murray Regiment carried Kronacker in an impetuous assault, lost it to Ney's counterattack, and captured it again. Later in the day, the French retook Kronacker before losing it again to a charge by the Murray Regiment. By this time, Kienmayer found out that the French had smashed Johann Kollowrat's Left Center Column and he issued orders to retreat. In spite of the difficult tactical situation, Schwarzenberg was able to withdraw his division in good order.

== Napoleonic Wars ==
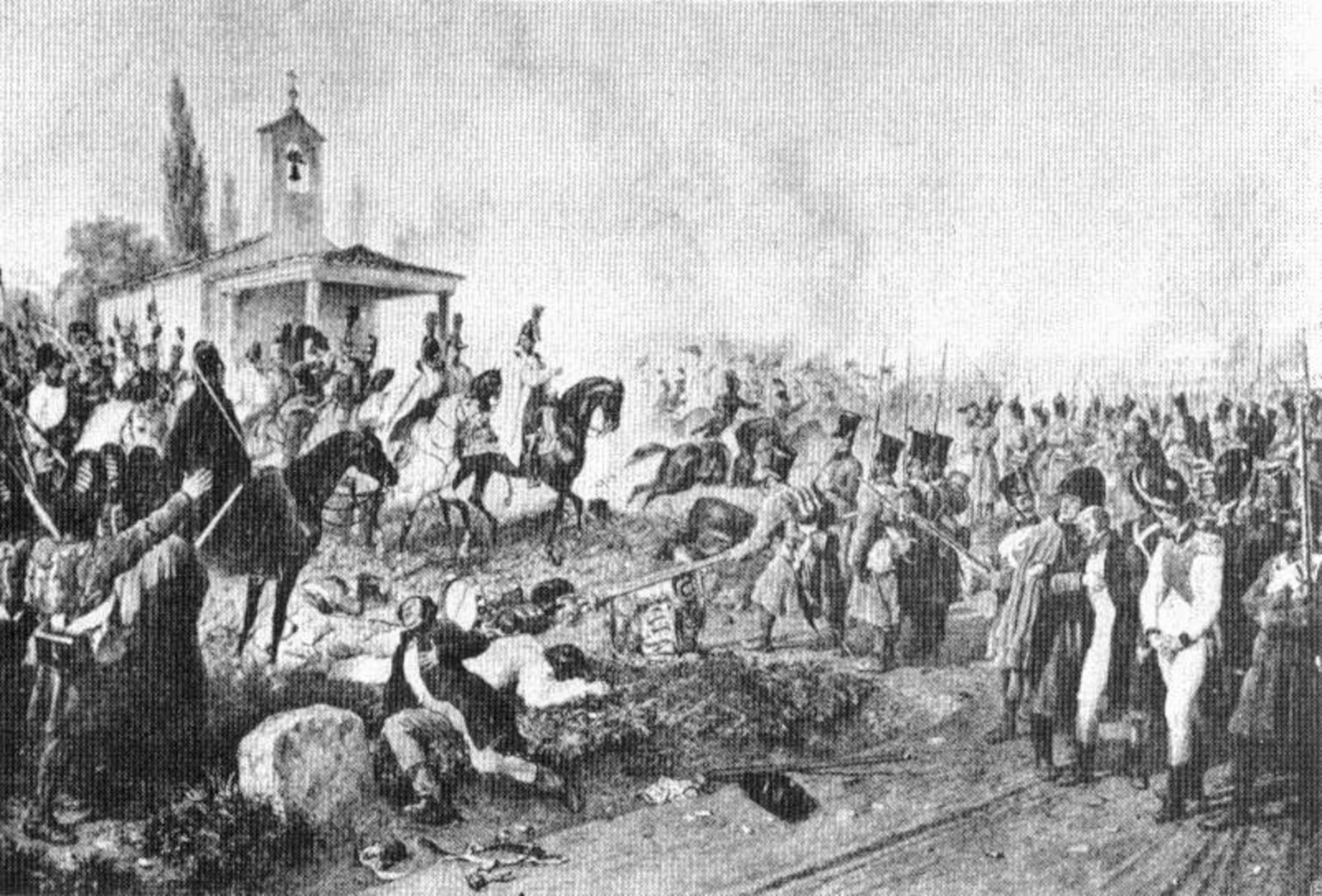
Archduke Charles at the Battle of Caldiero

From 1801 to 1805, Gavasini commanded in Carniola, which roughly corresponds to modern-day Slovenia. His headquarters was located in Ljubljana (Laibach).

In the War of the Third Coalition, Gavasini led a seven battalion brigade in Archduke Charles, Duke of Teschen's Army of Italy. At the time of the Battle of Verona, his unit was assigned to the Left wing under Paul Davidovich. After a reorganization, he fought in Eugène-Guillaume Argenteau's Reserve at the Battle of Caldiero on 29–31 October 1805. His brigade included four battalions of the Archduke Rudolf Infantry Regiment Nr. 16, three battalions of the Lattermann Infantry Regiment Nr. 45, and eight squadrons of the Stipczic Hussar Regiment Nr. 10.

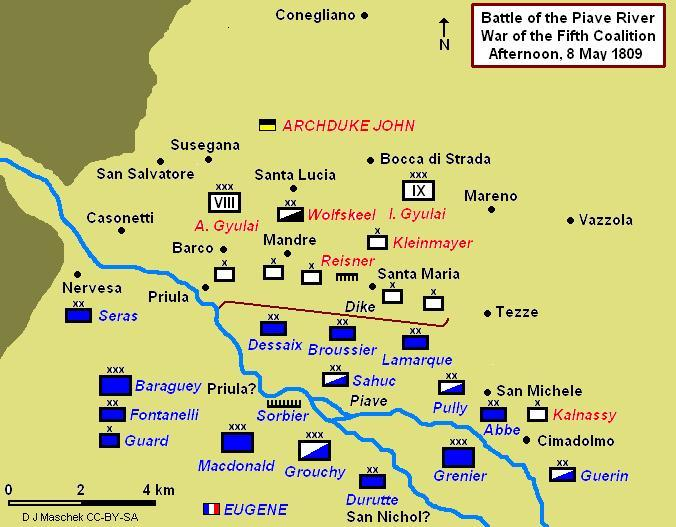
Battle of Piave River showing 8 May 1809 afternoon positions

Gavasini resigned from the army in 1806, but was recalled up to service before the outbreak of the War of the Fifth Coalition. At the beginning of the conflict he commanded a brigade of Landwehr that comprised two battalions from Trieste, two battalions from Gorizia (Görz), and four battalions from Postojna (Adelsberg). After the eruption of the Tyrolean Rebellion, the Austrian high command dispatched Johann Gabriel Chasteler de Courcelles and a division to the aid of the rebels. In the consequent reorganization of Archduke John of Austria's Army of Inner Austria, Gavasini emerged as brigade commander in the IX Armeekorps of Ignaz Gyulai. His brigade was made up of three battalions of the Reisky Infantry Regiment N. 13 and one and one-half battalions of the Otocaner Grenz Infantry Regiment Nr. 2. He led this unit at the Battle of Sacile on 16 April 1809. The VIII Armeekorps of Albert Gyulai absorbed the main attack of Eugène de Beauharnais' army while the IX Armeekorps waited in reserve. In the afternoon, Archduke John unleashed Ignaz Gyulai's troops and they pressed back the outmatched Franco-Italian left flank to win the contest.

At the Battle of Piave River on 8 May 1809, he commanded two battalions of the Otocaner Regiment in the IX Armeekorps. None of the sources specify where Gavasini's brigade deployed. However, Albert Gyulai's two VIII Armeekorps brigades held the right flank near Mandre while Johann Kalnássy's IX Armeekorps brigade formed the extreme left flank at Cimadolmo. Late in the afternoon, the Franco-Italian army broke through Ignaz Gyulai's line in the center and forced Archduke John to commit his reserve brigade of grenadiers. When these elite troops failed to stop their enemies, the Austrian army was forced to retreat.

After the Piave, Archduke John retreated to Villach with his main body while sending Ignaz Gyulai to Laibach to sustain the defense of Croatia. After a reorganization, Gavasini found himself leading a brigade in Anton von Zach's division of Ignaz Gyulai's army corps. He commanded two battalions of the Otocaner Regiment, two battalions of the Archduke Franz Karl Infantry Regiment Nr. 52, and eight cannons of a 3-pound brigade battery. On 24 June, the Otocaner and Archduke Franz Karl Regiments skirmished with Jean-Baptiste Broussier's division at Karlsdorf, now a suburb of Graz. The troops also fought in the Battle of Graz on 25 and 26 June.

Gavasini retired again on 10 December 1809 and never returned to military service. He died at Klagenfurt on 28 November 1834.
