= Nicolas Broussier =

French military officer (1774-1850)

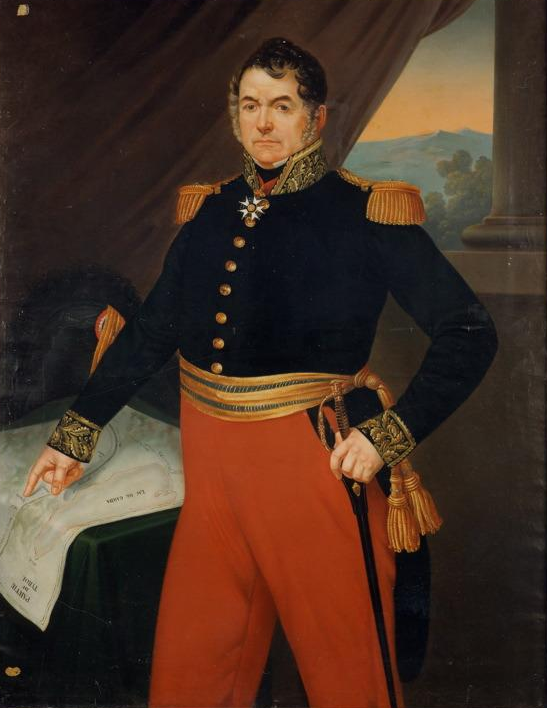
Anonymous portrait of Nicolas Broussier

Nicolas Broussier (1774, Ville-sur-Saulx - 10 January 1850, Bar-le-Duc, of apoplexy) was a French soldier and officer.

== Life ==
He first joined up as a volunteer in one of the many battalions which the Meuse department sent to the French frontier at the start of the French Revolutionary Wars, receiving a baptism of fire at Arlon. During the 1801 campaign to the crossing of the Mincio he was wounded again in pushing the enemy out of the village of Pazzolo at the head of some tirailleurs of the 43rd. He was a legionnaire from 1803, when he became aide-de-camp to his cousin general Jean-Baptiste Broussier. He became Maréchal de camp (1823).

== Sources ==
- Mullié, Charles (1852). "BROUSSIER (JEAN-BAPTISTE, comte)" . Biographie des célébrités militaires des armées de terre et de mer de 1789 à 1850 (in French). Paris: Poignavant et Compagnie.
