= Capitulation of Dornbirn =

1805 battle during the War of the Third Coalition

- Part of the War of the Third Coalition
- Map of the Dornbirn area
Date	13 November 1805
Location	Dornbirn, Austria 47°24′50″N 09°44′40″E
Result	French victory

Belligerents
France	Austrian Empire

Commanders and leaders
(France) Pierre Augereau	(Holy Roman Empire) Franz Jellacic

Units involved
VII Corps	Jellacic's Division

Strength
14,000	4,058

Casualties and losses
None	4,058; 7 colours captured

The Capitulation of Dornbirn (13 November 1805) saw the French VII Corps under Marshal Pierre Augereau face an Austrian force led by Feldmarschall-Leutnant (FML) Franz Jellacic. Isolated near Lake Constance (Bodensee) by superior numbers of French troops, Jellacic surrendered the infantry and artillery under his command. However, his cavalry managed to escape to Bohemia. The event occurred during the War of the Third Coalition, part of the Napoleonic Wars.

Dornbirn is located in the Austrian province of Vorarlberg, about 12 kilometres (7 mi) south of Bregenz at the eastern end of Lake Constance.

== Background ==
On 9 September 1805, an Austrian army under the nominal command of Archduke Ferdinand Karl Joseph of Austria-Este crossed the frontier into the Electorate of Bavaria without a declaration of war. The Austrian army, which was actually under the control of FML Karl Mack von Leiberich, hoped to force the Bavarian army to join the Third Coalition against France. In fact, the Bavarian elector had signed a secret treaty with France and marched his army north to Würzburg to meet with his French allies. By 18 September, Mack's army was arrayed near Ulm where it watched the Black Forest to the west. Mack expected that it would take the French two months to react, however by 24 September Emperor Napoleon's Grand Army was already on the Rhine River.

Altogether, the Austrian army in Bavaria numbered 66,000 infantry and 9,000 cavalry. Mack hoped that the French army would attack from the west. Against the Austrians, Napoleon's Grand Army had an effective strength of 210,500 soldiers, including seven French army corps, the French Cavalry Reserve, and the Bavarians and other German allies. On 2 October, the Grand Army began a gigantic right wheel. On 7 October, 180,000 French and allied soldiers reached the Danube River between Ingolstadt and Dillingen an der Donau. FML Michael von Kienmayer's weak Austrian force defending the area was compelled to retreat toward Augsburg. At this time, Mack finally woke up to his danger and began to concentrate his army, including Jellacic's troops, around Ulm. After crossing the Danube, Napoleon's troops marched south to cut off Mack's army from Vienna. Most of the Grand Army moved west to deal with Mack's army while three corps moved east to block any intervention by Austria's Russian allies.

In the Ulm Campaign, Mack's forces attempted to break out of the trap. FML Franz von Werneck's corps fought its way out to the northeast, but it was hunted down and captured on 18 October. Only Archduke Ferdinand and some cavalry managed to escape to Bohemia. Jellacic marched first to Biberach before slipping away south to the Vorarlberg with one division. On 19 October, Mack surrendered with 23,000 Austrians at Ulm. The rapid destruction of Mack's army was a major victory for Napoleon, but it did not end the war. A 50,000-strong Russian army arrived at Braunau am Inn to combine with Kienmayer's survivors while the Kingdom of Prussia threatened to join the Coalition. After the drawn Battle of Caldiero against Marshal André Masséna at the end of October, the Austrian army of Archduke Charles, Duke of Teschen began to withdraw from Italy.

== Operations ==
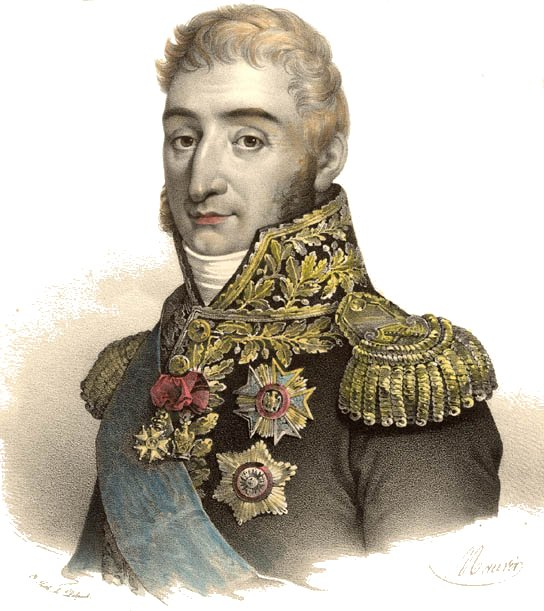
Marshal Augereau

At the beginning of the war, Augereau's VII Corps was stationed at Bayonne on the Atlantic Ocean. Since it would reach the theater of action later than the rest of the Grand Army, the VII Corps was designated the reserve. On 24 September, when the rest of the Grand Army was on the banks of the Rhine, Augereau's troops were still in transit across France. Around 25 October, VII Corps crossed the Rhine at Huningue and advanced to Stockach. Augereau then seized Lindau and Bregenz.

After the surrender of Ulm, Napoleon ordered Marshal Michel Ney's VI Corps to march south to Innsbruck. This would keep an Austrian corps under Archduke John of Austria from interfering with his supply line through Swabia. General of Division (GD) Auguste de Marmont's II Corps moved from Salzburg toward Leoben to keep the army under Archduke Charles away from Vienna. Marmont's corps reached at Leoben on 7 November. Ney's corps attempted to force the mountain passes at Scharnitz and Leutasch on 4 November. At Scharnitz, 6,000 French infantry were repulsed by 804 Austrian infantry, 894 militia, and 12 guns. The French suffered 800 casualties while the Austrian only lost 100. At Leutasch, 1,500 soldiers of the 69th Line Infantry overwhelmed the Austrian defenders, capturing 600 regular infantry and 4 guns while reporting only 26 casualties. By overrunning the Leutasch valley, the French outflanked the Austrians and forced them to abandon Scharnitz. The French occupied Innsbruck on 5 November.

The French capture of Scharnitz and Innsbruck left Jellacic completely isolated. However, Jellacic seemed slow to grasp the extent of his danger. On 6 November, Generalmajor Christian Wolfskehl von Reichenberg and Oberst (colonel) Wartensleben approached Jellacic about their concerns that their forces were becoming surrounded. Jellacic replied that he hoped to be able to join Archduke John's army, but if that failed, he might try to escape through Swabia to Bohemia. On 12 November, Wolfskehl agreed to let Obersts Wartensleben and Kinsky escape with their cavalry units. Later, Jellacic tried to cancel that order, but it was too late since the cavalry had already left Bregenz. Jellacic intended to defend at Hohenems and had built fortifications for that purpose. He decided that it was hopeless for his 4,500 troops to resist Augereau's great superiority of numbers. He sent Wolfskehl to negotiate with the French who demanded unconditional surrender. On 14 November 1805, Wolfskehl was able to work out a capitulation whereby the Austrians would hand over their weapons and be repatriated to Bohemia with the promise not to serve against the French for one year. The capitulation was affirmed at Dornbirn on 13 November, according to Digby Smith. Edward Cust stated that it was concluded with GD Maurice Mathieu on 15 November. The capitulation included three generals, 160 officers, 3,895 rank and file, and seven colors.

== Forces ==
=== French order of battle ===
Augereau's VII Corps numbered 14,000 men and consisted of two infantry divisions. In the 1805 campaign, there was no corps cavalry brigade. The artillery was armed with fifteen 8-pounders, five 4-pounders, and eight 6-inch howitzers. All of the units under the Corps Artillery, except the 8th Principal Train/6th Company and 7th Miner/4th Company, were listed as detached on 6 November 1805.

Marshal Augereau's French VII Corps on 6 November 1805
Division	Brigade	Unit	Officers	Men
1st Division; GD Jacques Desjardin	Brigade; General of Brigade (GB) Pierre Belon Lapisse	16th Light Infantry Regiment (3 battalions)	93	2,289
1st Division; GD Jacques Desjardin	Brigade; General of Brigade (GB) Pierre Belon Lapisse	7th Horse Chasseurs Regiment	7	130
1st Division; GD Jacques Desjardin	Brigade; GB Jean Maximilien Lamarque	44th Line Infantry Regiment (2 battalions)	59	1,296
1st Division; GD Jacques Desjardin	Brigade; GB Jean Maximilien Lamarque	105th Line Infantry Regiment (3 battalions)	59	1,519
1st Division; GD Jacques Desjardin	Brigade; GB Jean Maximilien Lamarque	4th Sapper Battalion, 2nd Company	1	46
1st Division; GD Jacques Desjardin	Artillery; Major Dubois	3rd Foot Artillery Regiment, 4th Company	2	63
1st Division; GD Jacques Desjardin	Artillery; Major Dubois	8th Principal Train Battalion, 1st and 2nd Companies	6	156
2nd Division; GD Maurice Mathieu	Brigade; GB Jean Sarrazin	7th Light Infantry Regiment (2 battalions)	93	2,001
2nd Division; GD Maurice Mathieu	Brigade; GB Jean Sarrazin	63rd Line Infantry Regiment (2 battalions)	60	1,277
2nd Division; GD Maurice Mathieu	Brigade; GB Jacques Thomas Sarrut	24th Line Infantry Regiment (3 battalions)	90	1,876
2nd Division; GD Maurice Mathieu	Brigade; GB Jacques Thomas Sarrut	4th Sapper Battalion, 4th Company	3	73
2nd Division; GD Maurice Mathieu	Cavalry	7th (?) Horse Chasseurs Regiment	9	176
2nd Division; GD Maurice Mathieu	Artillery; Major Dardemer	5th Foot Artillery Regiment, 3rd Company	3	66
2nd Division; GD Maurice Mathieu	Artillery; Major Dardemer	1st Principal Train Battalion, 1st and 2nd Companies	2	195
Corps Artillery	Not brigaded	3rd Foot Artillery Regiment, 2nd Company	3	94
Corps Artillery	Not brigaded	3rd Foot Artillery Regiment, 3rd Company	3	94
Corps Artillery	Not brigaded	6th Horse Artillery Regiment, 5th Company	-	-
Corps Artillery	Not brigaded	6th Artillery Artisan Company	1	70
Corps Artillery	Not brigaded	8th Principal Train Battalion, 5th and 6th Companies	2	177
Corps Artillery	Not brigaded	7th Miner Battalion, 4th Company	4	81

=== Austrian order of battle ===
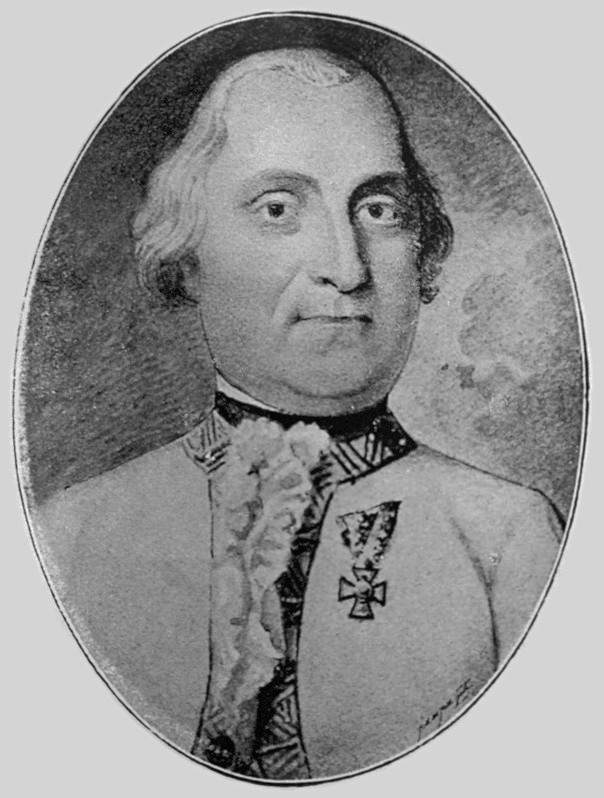
Franz Jellacic

Austrian force at Dornbirn under Franz Jellacic
Unit	No. Battalions
2nd Jäger Battalion	1
Stain Infantry Regiment Nr. 50	3
Franz Jellacic Infantry Regiment Nr. 62	3
Beaulieu Infantry Regiment Nr. 58, Grenadier battalion	1
Combined battalions	1½

== Aftermath ==
Jellacic's cavalry managed to escape within Austrian lines. Six squadrons of the Blankenstein Hussar Regiment Nr. 6 and four squadrons of the Klenau Chevau-léger Regiment Nr. 5 plus six guns successfully escaped to Eger in Bohemia. They easily evaded the Bavarian brigade detailed to block their path and captured 25 wagons at Ellwangen.

After eliminating Jellacic's force, Augereau's VII Corps was ordered to Ulm where it defended south Germany. The army of Archduke Charles retreated from Italy, fighting rearguard actions against Masséna at the Brenta, Piave, Tagliamento, and Isonzo Rivers. Charles reached Ljubljana (Laybach) while the smaller army of Archduke John reached Klagenfurt am Wörthersee on 20 November. The two Austrian armies finally united at Maribor (Marburg) on the Drava River. After a further retreat, Archduke Charles' 80,000-man army reached Körmend in Hungary on 2 December 1805. This was the same day that the decisive Battle of Austerlitz was fought. On 6 December, an armistice was signed that took Austria out of the Third Coalition.

An Austrian division led by Generalmajor Louis Victor Meriadec de Rohan-Guéméné was also isolated at Landeck in the County of Tyrol. On 10 November, Rohan marched to the south through Nauders and Bolzano but failed to make contact with Archduke John or Archduke Charles. Rohan's force surprised the French garrison of Bassano on 22 November. Marching hard, the Austrians reached Castelfranco Veneto the following evening. On 24 November, Rohan's remarkable trek came to an end in the Battle of Castelfranco Veneto when his troops were trapped between the divisions of GD Jean Reynier and GD Laurent Gouvion Saint-Cyr. After a struggle, Rohan surrendered 4,400 Austrian soldiers, 5 guns, and 4 colors.
