= Christian Wolfskehl von Reichenberg =

Austrian general

- Born: 1761; Würzburg, Prince-Bishopric of Würzburg
- Died: 8 May 1809 (aged 47–48) Ponte della Priula, Italy
- Allegiance: Habsburg monarchy Austrian Empire
- Branch: Cavalry
- Rank: Feldmarschall-Leutnant
- Conflicts: Austro-Turkish War (1788–1791); French Revolutionary Wars; Rhine Campaign of 1796; Battle of Rivoli (1797); Battle of Wiesloch (1799); Battle of Hohenlinden (1800); Napoleonic Wars; Capitulation of Dornbirn (1805); Battle of Sacile (1809); Battle of Piave River (1809) †
- Awards: Military Order of Maria Theresa

Christian Wolfskehl von Reichenberg (1761 – 8 May 1809) was cavalry officer who fought in the armies of Habsburg Austria and the Austrian Empire during the Austro-Turkish War, French Revolutionary Wars, and Napoleonic Wars. He was captured in the War of the Third Coalition. He was promoted to command a cavalry division during the War of the Fifth Coalition and was killed in action while leading his troopers against the French at the Battle of Piave River in May 1809.

== Early career ==
Christian Wolfskehl von Reichenberg was born in Würzburg in the Prince-Bishopric of Würzburg in 1761. His younger brother was Philipp Siegmund Freiherr Wolfskehl von Reichenberg (1762–1838). He joined the Habsburg Austrian army in 1788 at the start of the War of the Bavarian Succession, serving as a under-lieutenant in the Levenehr Chevau-léger Regiment No. 19. Wolfskehl served in the Austro-Turkish War as a captain in the Wallisch Cuirassier Regiment No. 21. During this conflict he was recognized as a gifted cavalry officer. He was promoted major and reassigned as Platzmajor at Vienna in September 1791.

== First Coalition ==
In February 1794, Wolfskehl transferred back into Lorraine Cuirassier Regiment No. 21, formerly Wallisch. In September 1796, he served in the army of Maximilian Anton Karl, Count Baillet de Latour during the Rhine Campaign of 1796 in the War of the First Coalition. Because an Austrian force at Scharnitz was under French pressure, Wolfskehl was ordered to march to Starnberg with four squadrons of the Lorraine Regiment, two squadrons of the Slavonisch Hussar Regiment, and two artillery pieces. He carried out his diversion to Starnberg, but found that there was a French artillery unit camped at Dachau on the outskirts of Munich. He decided to raid the camp, and on 7 September his horsemen surprised and routed the French. His cavalrymen carried off 300 prisoners, several guns, and ammunition.

On 20 September 1796, Wolfskehl's corps commander Michael von Fröhlich ordered him to lead a vanguard of one squadron of the Lorraine Regiment and three infantry companies to Isny im Allgäu. Wolfskehl found the town deserted and pushed on to a place called Dortweil where he was attacked by French troops from Pierre Marie Barthélemy Ferino's division. Despite being heavily outnumbered, his force held off the French for three hours until Fröhlich's main body arrived. At this time, Wolfskehl led the Lorraine Regiment in a rapid attack, driving off and capturing 650 French soldiers. The Lorraine Regiment fought in the Austrian victory at the Battle of Schliengen on 24 October 1796.

Wolfskehl's exploits resulted in a promotion to Oberstleutnant (lieutenant colonel) and reassignment to the Staff Dragoon Regiment in December 1796. In 1797, he assumed command of the Staff Dragoon Regiment from Joseph Döller and led the regiment until it was discontinued the same year. After transfer to Italy, he led the regiment at the Battle of Rivoli on 14–15 January 1797 and fought with the rearguard. At Lavis, he and his regiment broke out of a French trap and on 20 January he held off the French pursuit of Barthélemy Catherine Joubert at Salorno. In May 1797, he was promoted to Oberst (colonel) and appointed commander of Duke Albert Cuirassier Regiment Nr. 5. The unit's designation was changed to Nr. 3 in 1798.

== Second Coalition ==
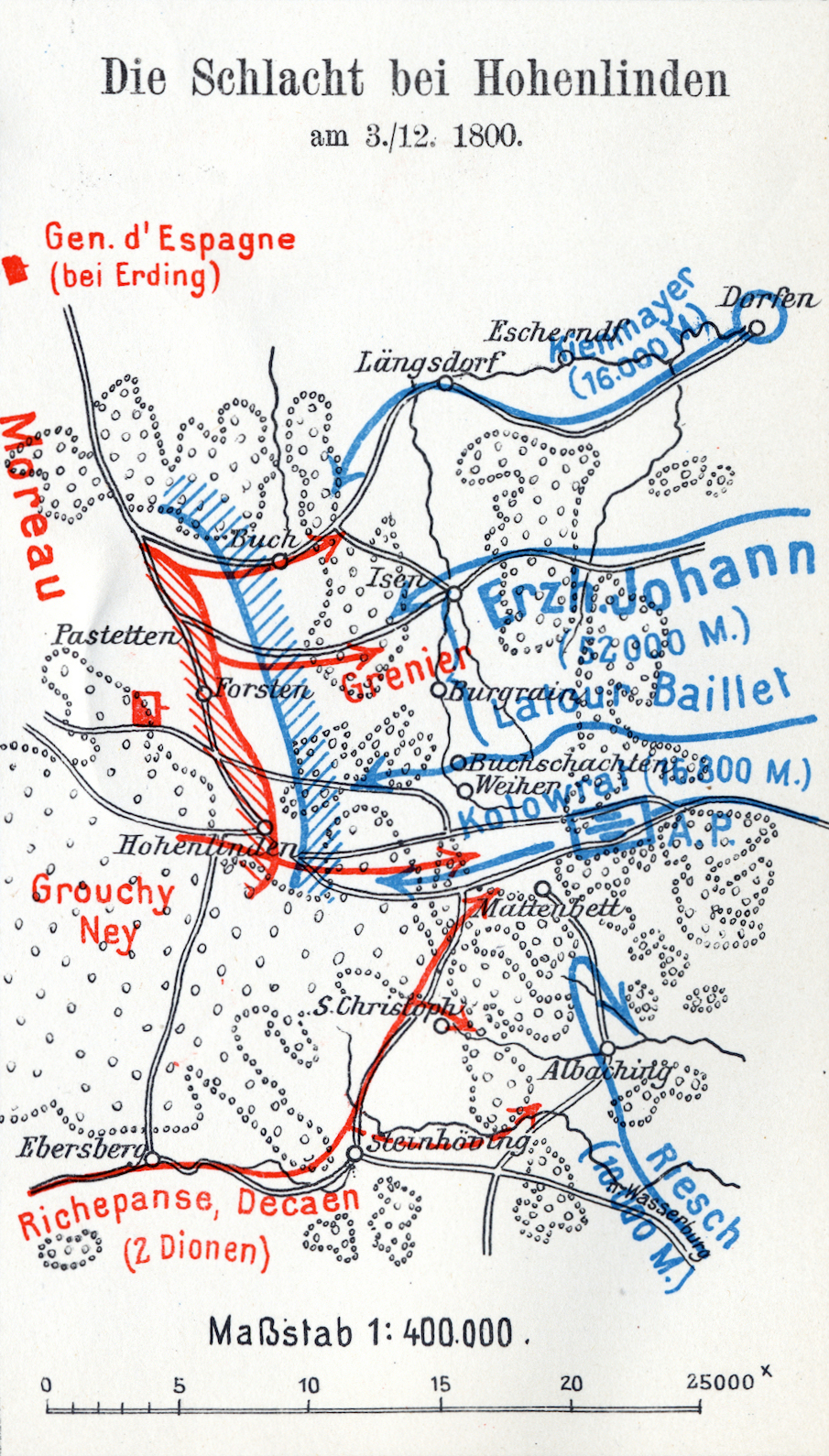
Battle of Hohenlinden

On 3 December 1799 during the War of the Second Coalition, Wolfskehl led his regiment at the Battle of Wiesloch. This action compelled the French to lift the siege of Philippsburg. He was promoted Generalmajor on 29 October 1800. At the Battle of Hohenlinden on 3 December 1800, Wolfskehl led a cavalry brigade in Johann I Joseph, Prince of Liechtenstein's division, part of Johann Kollowrat's column. The brigade included six squadrons each of the Duke Albert Nr. 3 and Lorraine Nr. 7 Cuirassier Regiments and eight squadrons of the Vecsey Hussar Regiment Nr. 4. During the battle, Kollowrat's westward-moving column was severed at the village of Maitenbeth by a French division under Antoine Richepanse coming from the south. The only units east of the break were Wolfskehl's brigade, a Bavarian cavalry regiment, the reserve artillery, and the baggage train. Wolfskehl's horsemen charged repeatedly to drive off Richepanse's infantry, but failed to break through. Almost surrounded, the bulk of Kollowrat's column collapsed in panic.

In the aftermath of Hohenlinden, the French army advanced 200 mi (322 km) in fifteen days. The disintegrating Austrian army lost 20,000 prisoners and much of its artillery and baggage. The exception was a stout action at Salzburg on 14 December in which the Austrian rearguard repulsed its French pursuers. On the same day near Salzburg, Wolfskehl led 13 cavalry squadrons, the Morwitz Grenadier Battalion, and six guns in a successful defense of the Salzach River at Anthering. He was awarded the Knight's Cross of the Military Order of Maria Theresa on 18 August 1801.

== Third Coalition ==
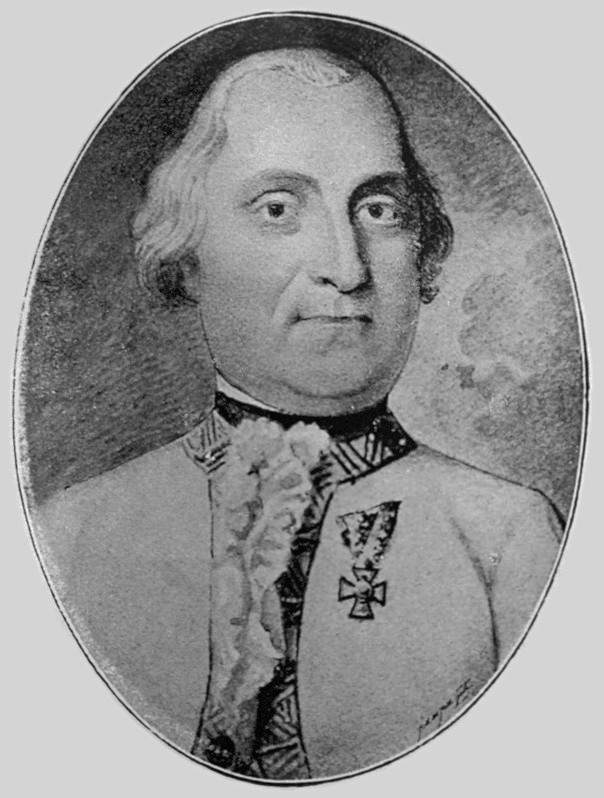
Franz Jellacic

Wolfskehl served as a brigade commander in the corps of Franz Jellacic during the Ulm campaign in the War of the Third Coalition. At the start of September 1805, Wolfskehl exercised an independent command of seven infantry battalions and two cavalry squadrons at Bregenz and Feldkirch. The Austrian commander Karl Mack von Leiberich led 66,000 infantry and 9,000 cavalry into Bavaria and assumed the French army would attack him from the west. Instead, Emperor Napoleon appeared on 7 October 1805 with 180,000 troops along the Danube River. On 8 October, Wolfskehl led a brigade under Jellacic consisting of the Chasteler Jäger Battalion and the Hildburghausen Nr. 41, Stain Nr. 50, and Beaulieu Nr. 58 Grenadier Battalions. This was part of Mack's army. Almost all of the remainder of Mack's army was trapped and forced to surrender but Jellacic slipped away south to the Vorarlberg in mid-October.

On 6 November 1805, Wolfskehl expressed concern that their troops were becoming isolated. Jellacic responded that he hoped to be able to join with the army of Archduke John of Austria but if that proved impossible, he would consider trying to escape through Swabia to Bohemia. On 12 November, Wolfskehl authorized Obersts Wartensleben and Kinsky to escape with their cavalry. Later, Jellacic tried to cancel that order, but by that time the cavalry had left Bregenz. Jellacic hoped to defend at Hohenems but when 15,000 French troops appeared, he decided that his 4,500 troops had no chance. He sent Wolfskehl to treat with the French. The French demanded unconditional surrender, but Wolfskehl was able to negotiate an agreement on 14 November that the Austrians would surrender their weapons and be repatriated to Bohemia with the promise not to serve against the French for one year. Jellacic's infantry and artillery were captured in the Capitulation of Dornbirn. Meanwhile, six squadrons of the Blankenstein Hussar Regiment Nr. 6 and four squadrons of the Klenau Chevau-Léger Regiment Nr. 5 plus six guns successfully escaped to Eger in Bohemia. In 1806, Wolfskehl married Maria Martha Eveline Ley.

== Fifth Coalition ==
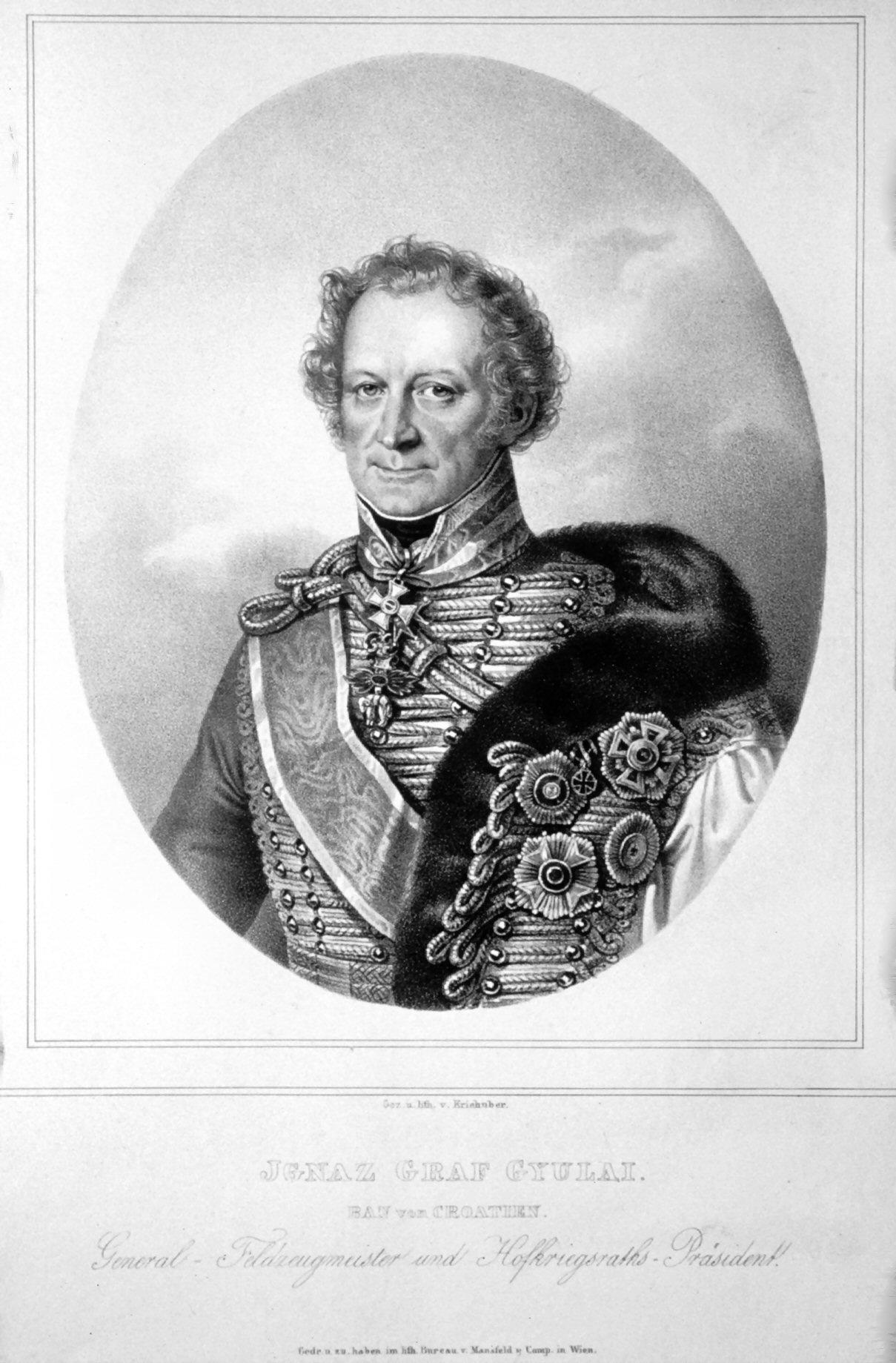
Ignaz Gyulai

Wolfskehl was promoted to Feldmarschall-Leutnant on 12 February 1809. He vowed that he would not survive a defeat in the coming war. At the start of the War of the Fifth Coalition, the Army of Italy under Archduke John consisted of the VIII and IX Army Corps. The IX Corps was led by Ignaz Gyulai and included three divisions. Wolfskehl led the 2nd Division which was made up of four grenadier battalions, two dragoon regiments, two hussar regiments, and 26 guns. The divisional artillery was organized into one 3-pounder brigade, one 6-pounder position, and two 6-pounder cavalry batteries.

After a reorganization, the Battle of Sacile on 16 April 1809 saw Wolfskehl commanding a cavalry division composed of two brigades. The first brigade was made up of six squadrons each of the Hohenlohe Nr. 2 and Savoy Nr. 5 Dragoon Regiments. The second brigade had six squadrons of the Archduke Joseph Hussar Regiment Nr. 2 and four squadrons of the Frimont Hussar Regiment Nr. 9. With the French in retreat, an opportunity for unleashing a brilliant cavalry charge was missed. Instead, Gyulai cautiously held back Wolfskehl's cavalry to protect his infantry.

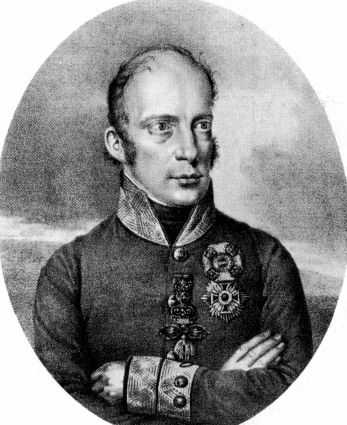
Archduke John

Events in Bavaria caused the Austrian government to order Archduke John to retreat from Italy. John retreated to the Piave River and elected to defend the position. The Battle of the Piave River was fought on 7–8 May 1809. Wolfskehl commanded five regiments of Austrian cavalry, a total of 2,750 troopers. These included the same two dragoon regiments that fought at Sacile, plus eight squadrons each of the Archduke Joseph Nr. 2 and Ott Nr. 5 Hussar Regiments, and six squadrons of the Frimont Hussar Regiment Nr. 9.

At 7:00 am on 8 May, the French thrust 5,000 infantry across the Piave, and they were charged by Wolfskehl's cavalry. The French formed into two large squares and the Austrian horsemen were driven off. The Austrian artillery began bombarding the French squares, causing serious casualties. The French commander Eugène de Beauharnais ordered artillery and cavalry forward to protect his infantry. At about 10:00 am, Wolfskehl's rallied cavalry advanced to the attack again. This time, they were opposed by two divisions of French cavalry in addition to the infantry. This resulted in a terrific cavalry melee in which the Austrian cavalry was overwhelmed and beaten. During the melee, Wolfskehl charged into a troop of French cavalry and was stabbed to death.

== Notes ==
Military offices
Preceded by Joseph Döller	Commander, Staff Dragoon Regiment; 1797	Succeeded by none
