= Jean-Barthélemot Sorbier =

Jean Barthélemot Sorbier
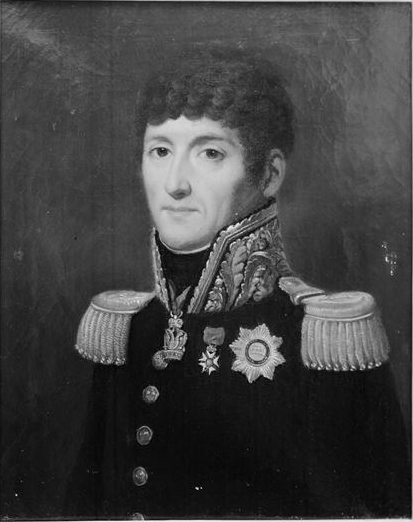
- General count Sorbier.
- Born: 17 November 1762; Paris, France
- Died: 23 July 1827 (aged 64); Saint-Sulpice, Nièvre, France
- Military career
- Allegiance: France
- Branch: Artillery
- Service years: 1782-1815
- Rank: General of Division
- Conflicts: French Revolutionary Wars; Napoleonic Wars
- Awards: Count of the Empire

Jean-Barthélemot Sorbier, count, (French pronunciation: [ʒɑ̃ baʁtelemo sɔʁbje]; 1762–1827), was a French general of the Napoleonic Wars.

== Revolutionary Wars ==
An aristocrat of the Ancien Régime, Sorbier joined the Royal Artillery Corps in 1782 and was a part of the La Fère regiment, where he met Napoleon Bonaparte. A captain in 1792, Sorbier is involved in the French Revolutionary Wars, taking part to the fighting in Northern France and on the Rhine. From September 1793 to April 1795, he was suspended, due to his aristocratic ascendancy. However, once he was reintegrated in the army, he was at once promoted to the rank of chef de brigade (colonel) and again was a part of the French Army of the Rhine, playing a remarkable part in the battle of Neuwied, on April 18, 1797. As a result, the commander-in-chief, general Lazare Hoche immediately promoted him to brigadier general on the field of battle. Three years later, in 1800, he became a general of division and general inspector of artillery.

== Napoleonic Wars ==
In 1805, he was a part of the first Grande Armée and was present at the battle of Austerlitz, before taking the command of the artillery of the French 'Army of Italy'. In 1808, Napoleon I created Sorbier a count of the Empire. In 1809, he played an active role in the War of the Fifth Coalition, replacing general Jean Ambroise Baston de Lariboisière as commander of the Imperial Guard Artillery, then, in 1812, was a part of the second Grande Armée during the Russian campaign, keeping his command of the Guard artillery. In 1813, Sorbier was named commander of the artillery of the Grande Armée, a command which he would retain during the 1814 campaign in France. During the Hundred Days, he joined Napoleon and after the downfall of the Emperor, Sorbier was exiled and then placed on the retirement list by King Louis XVIII.

== Recognition ==
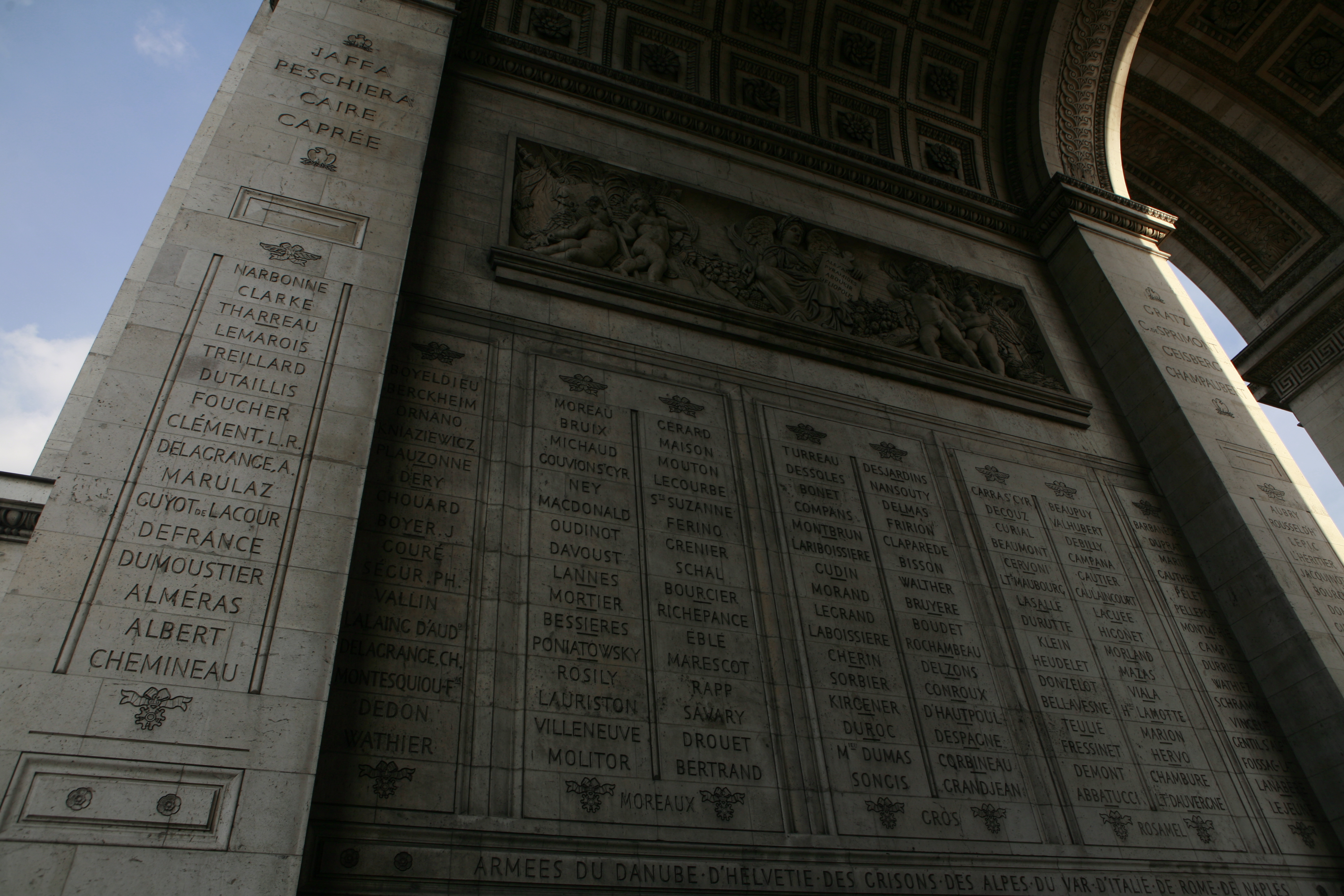
General Sorbier's named inscribed on the Eastern Pillar of the Arc de Triomphe (fifth column from left to right, 12th name from top to bottom).

The name SORBIER is inscribed under the Arc de Triomphe, Eastern Pillar, 15th Column.

== Sources ==
- Fierro, Alfredo; Palluel-Guillard, André; Tulard, Jean - "Histoire et Dictionnaire du Consulat et de l'Empire”, Éditions Robert Laffont, ISBN 2-221-05858-5
