= Jean-Baptiste Dominique Rusca =

French general (1759–1814)

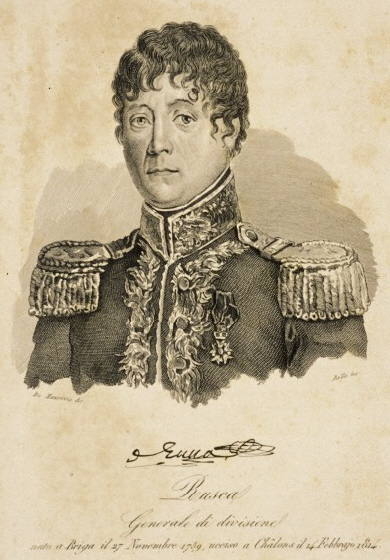
- Jean-Baptiste Dominique Rusca
- Born: 27 November 1759; La Brigue, County of Nice, Piedmont-Sardinia, now France
- Died: 14 February 1814 (aged 54) Soissons, France
- Allegiance: France
- Branch: Sappers, Infantry
- Rank: General of Division
- Conflicts: French Revolutionary Wars; Napoleonic Wars
- Awards: Légion d'Honneur
- Other work: Physician, Count of the Empire

Jean-Baptiste Dominique Rusca (French pronunciation: [ʒɑ̃ batist dɔminik ʁyska]; 27 November 1759 – 14 February 1814) was a French general.

He was born in the County of Nice, part of the Kingdom of Sardinia. By profession a medical doctor, he advocated the cause of the French Revolution and was expelled by the Sardinian authorities. In 1793, he treated the French sick and wounded during the Siege of Toulon and was appointed to command a sapper battalion. He later fought in the Army of Italy and the Army of the Eastern Pyrenees before returning to Italy. By the time of the Montenotte Campaign in 1796, he was a general officer leading major units. He was captured by the Austrians during the 1799 Italian campaign at the Battle of the Trebbia. After commanding garrisons for several years, he led a division in Italy during the War of the Fifth Coalition. He was killed in action at the Battle of Soissons during the War of the Sixth Coalition. Rusca is one of the names inscribed under the Arc de Triomphe.
