= Jean-Baptiste Broussier =

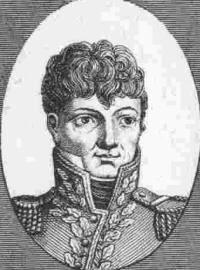
- Born: 10 March 1766; Ville-sur-Saulx, France
- Died: 13 December 1814 (aged 48); Bar-le-Duc, France
- Military career
- Allegiance: French First Republic, First French Empire
- Branch: Army
- Active: 1791–1814
- Rank: Général de division
- Conflicts: French Revolutionary Wars; Napoleonic Wars; Capture of La Spezia; Battle of Wagram
- Awards: Grand Officer of the Légion d'honneur Comte de l'Empire

Jean-Baptiste Broussier (French pronunciation: [ʒɑ̃ batist bʁusje]; 10 March 1766 – 13 December 1814) was a French Divisional General of the French Revolutionary Wars and Napoleonic Wars.

== Life ==
Broussier was born in Ville-sur-Saulx.

Meant by his parents for a church career, in 1791 he instead enrolled in the 3rd battalion of Meurthe and was made a captain of the Meuse volunteers in September of that year. He fought his first battles under Beurnonville in the northern campaigns and was severely wounded in the Vavrin affair in year II. Shortly afterwards he was made head of the battalion and was sent with them to armée de Sambre-et-Meuse, charged with the defence of an important post, where he was hit in the head by a musket ball.

In 1797 he moved to the armée d'Italie, where he was made chef de brigade to the 43e régiment d'infanterie de ligne. He fought with distinction at the capture of La Spezia, being one of the first to break into the fort at Chiusa, and took the Austrian general prisoner with his own hands. He was made chef de brigade in March 1797 following these actions and sent to the armée de Naples, before being charged with an expedition into the Apennines. He ambushed 12,000 peasant troops that had closed off the defile and a major carnage ensued in the Caudine Forks, the same place where the Samnites had caught the Romans. Promoted to brigadier general by Championnet for this action on the same day, he was then put in charge of the conquest of Naples, wholly destroying cardinal Fabrizio Ruffo's army, submitting the whole of Apulia after it rose against the French and captured and burned down the towns of Trani and Andria.

In 1799, the French Directory had him and Championnet dismissed and tried for extortion before a council of war, but after the coup d'état of 30 Prairial year VI the charges against Broussier were waived and he was returned him to his rank. With his cousin Nicolas Broussier as his aide-de-camp, he continued to serve with distinction in Italy until 1803, during which time he was made commander of the place de Paris. In 1805 he was promoted to divisional general, before being made Grand Officer of the Légion d'honneur on 21 July 1809, then comte de l'Empire the following October. He returned to Lombardy that same year, taking a large part at Wagram. He then served with equal brilliance in the French invasion of Russia and the 1813 Germany campaign. He took part in the battles of Ostrovno, Borodino, Maloyaroslavets and the Krasny. Straight after the disasters of 1813, he was put in command of the 3rd division of the observation corps at Mainz before being put in command of Strasbourg by Napoleon, where he was promptly besieged. In 1814 he took on command of the Meuse before dying of an apoplexy at Bar-le-Duc. His name is engraved on the north side of the Arc de Triomphe, in column 7.

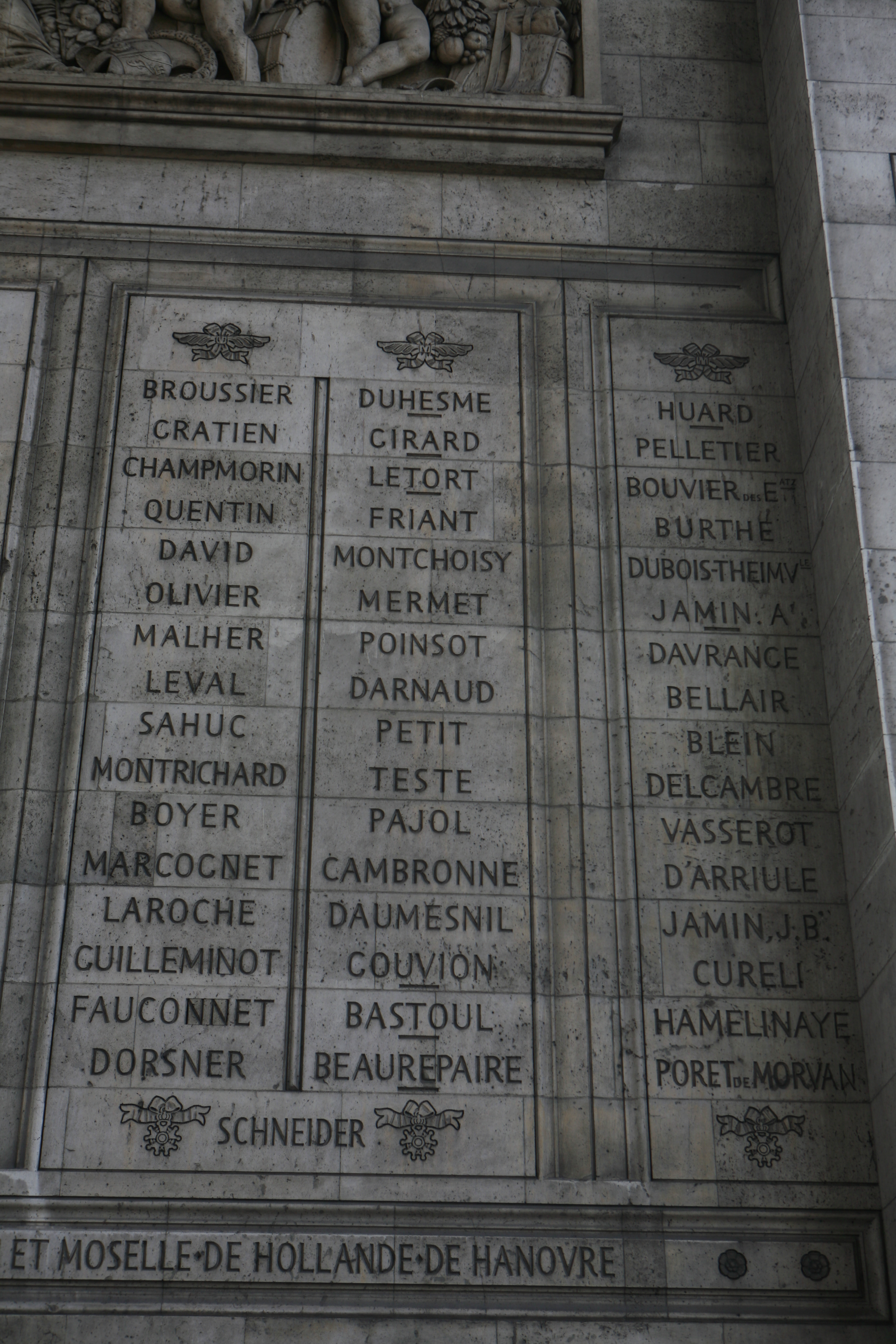
Broussier's name is inscribed on the Arc de Triomphe (1st from the top on the left).
