= Battle of Sacile order of battle =

The Battle of Sacile (16 April 1809) saw the Franco-Italian Army of Italy commanded by Eugène de Beauharnais face the Archduke John of Austria's Army of Inner Austria during the War of the Fifth Coalition. Believing that he was only opposed by the Austrian VIII Armeekorps, Eugène launched his right wing in a heavy attack against it. In the morning, the Austrians successfully held off Franco-Italian assaults on their left flank as Eugène reinforced the attack with troops from his left wing. Later in the day, John counterattacked Eugène's weakened left wing with the IX Armeekorps, forcing the Franco-Italian army to withdraw from the battlefield. The battle at Sacile was preceded by the action of Pordenone on 15 April in which the Austrian advance guard mauled the French rear guard. The Austrian victory compelled Eugène to retreat to the Adige River at Verona where he gathered reinforcements and planned a counteroffensive.

== Franco-Italian Army Order of Battle ==
=== Franco-Italian Army at Sacile ===
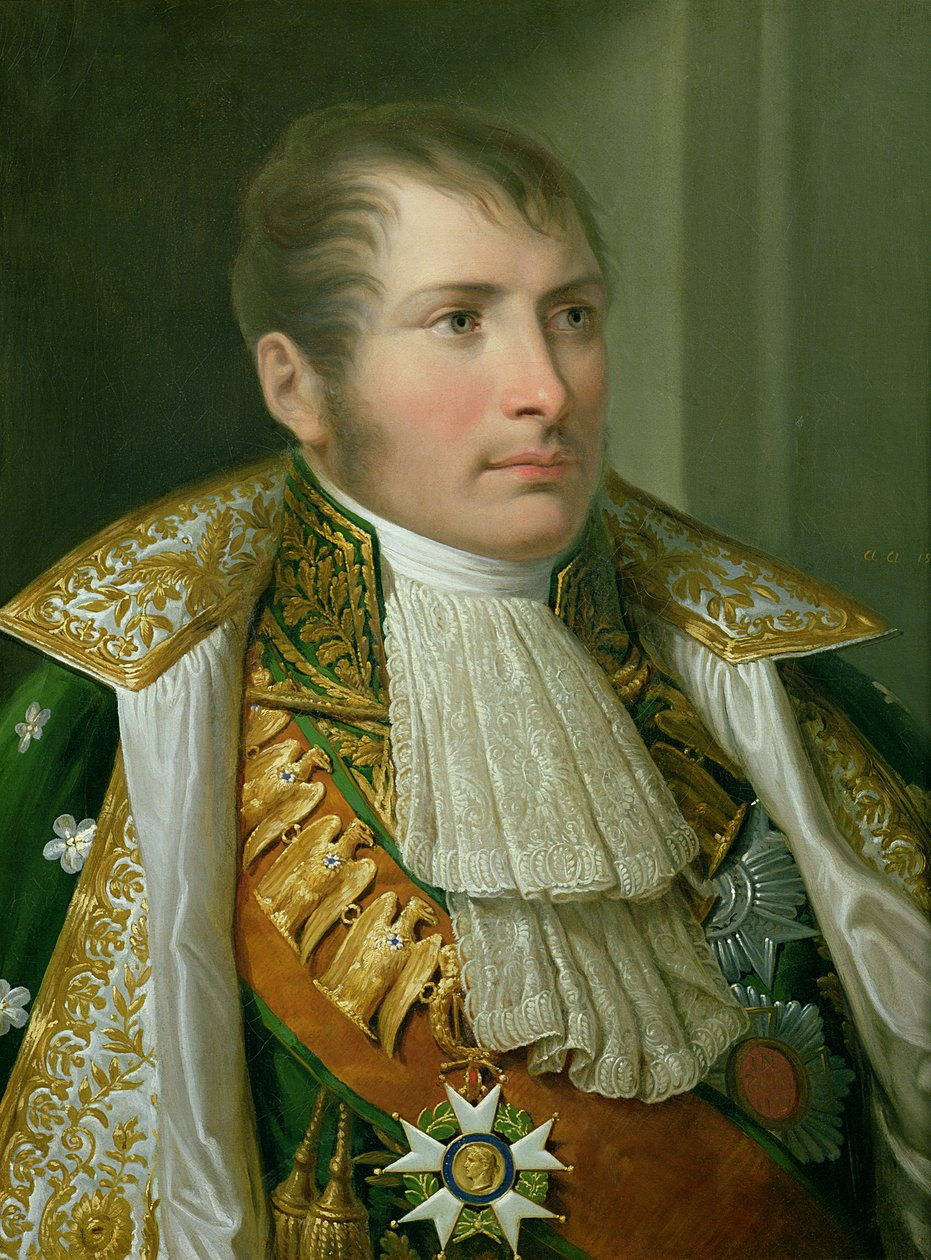
Eugène de Beauharnais

Army of Italy: Eugène de Beauharnais

- Chief of staff: General of Division Henri François Marie Charpentier
- Artillery: General of Division Jean-Barthélemot Sorbier (8 guns)
  - 2nd Foot Artillery Regiment, 1st Company (250 men, six 12-pound cannons, two 5-inch 7 li. howitzers)
- 1st Division: General of Division Jean-Mathieu Seras
  - 1st Brigade: General of Brigade Louis Gareau
    - 35th Line Infantry Regiment (2,800 in 4 battalions)
    - 53rd Line Infantry Regiment (2,800 in 4 battalions)
  - 2nd Brigade: General of Brigade Jean-Claude Roussel
    - 106th Line Infantry Regiment (2,800 in 4 battalions)
  - Attached Artillery: (12 guns)
    - Foot artillery company (four 8-pound cannons, two 6-inch (150 mm) howitzers)
    - Foot artillery company (four 4-pound cannons, two 6-inch (150 mm) howitzers)

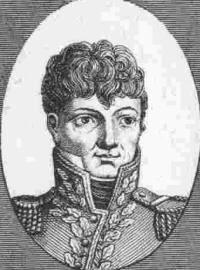
Jean Broussier

- 2nd Division: General of Division Jean-Baptiste Broussier
  - 1st Brigade: General of Brigade Joseph Marie, Count Dessaix
    - 9th Line Infantry Regiment (2,800 in 4 battalions)
  - 2nd Brigade: General of Brigade Jacques Dutruy
    - 84th Line Infantry Regiment (2,800 in 4 battalions)
    - 92nd Line Infantry Regiment (2,800 in 4 battalions)
    - 24th Dragoon Regiment (125 in the 4th Squadron)
  - Attached Artillery: (12 guns)
    - Foot artillery company (four 8-pound cannons, two 6-inch (150 mm) howitzers)
    - Foot artillery company (four 4-pound cannons, two 6-inch (150 mm) howitzers)

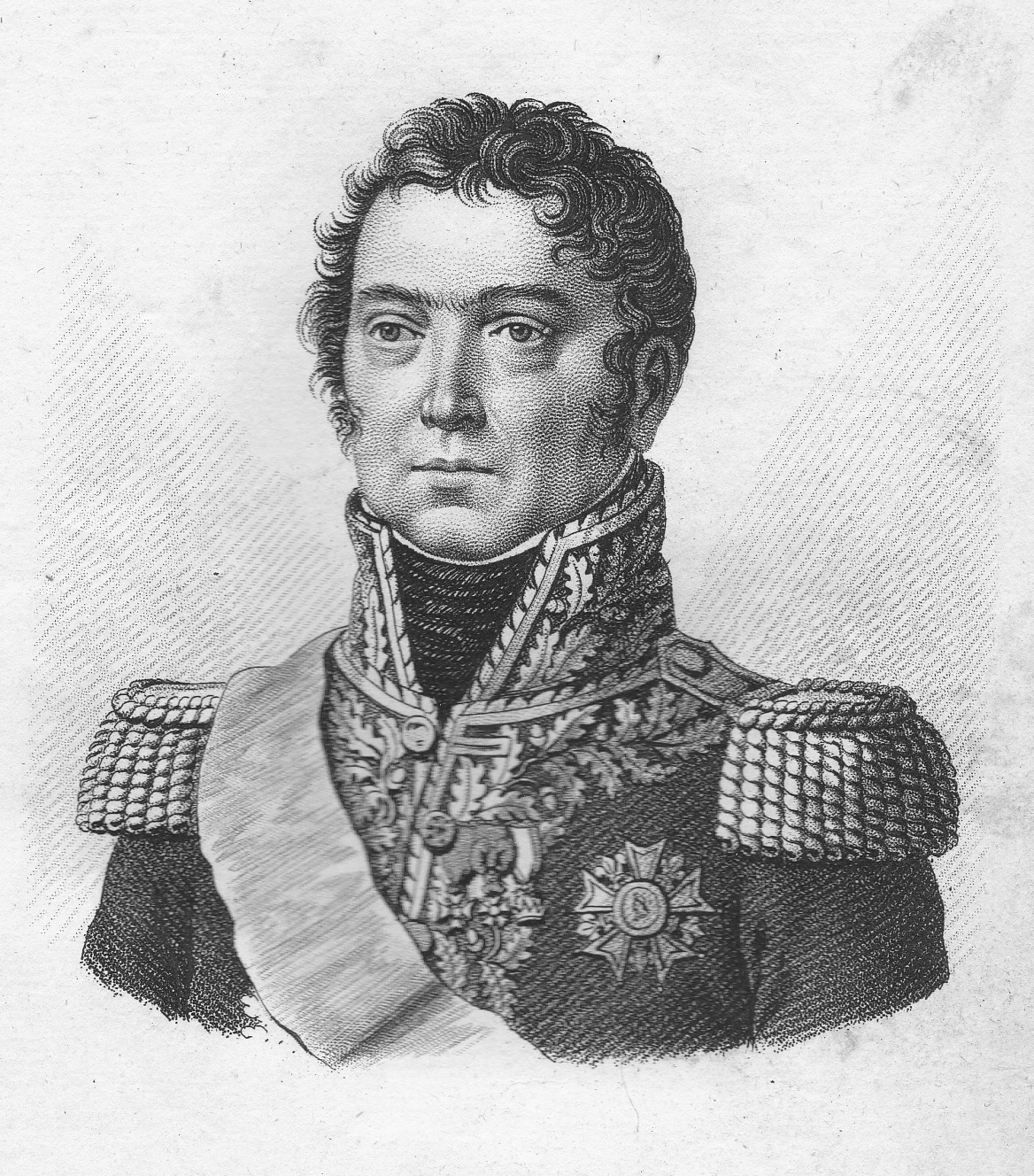
Paul Grenier

- 3rd Division: General of Division Paul Grenier
  - 1st Brigade: General of Brigade Louis Jean Nicolas Abbé
    - 1st Light Infantry Regiment (700 in the 4th Battalion)
    - 1st Line Infantry Regiment (2,800 in 4 battalions)
  - 2nd Brigade: General of Brigade François-Antoine Teste
    - 52nd Line Infantry Regiment (2,800 in 4 battalions)
    - 102nd Line Infantry Regiment (2,800 in 4 battalions)
    - Napoleone Italian Dragoon Regiment (125 in the 4th Squadron)
  - Attached Artillery: (12 guns)
    - Foot artillery company (six 8-pound cannons)
    - Foot artillery company (four 4-pound cannons, two 6-inch (150 mm) howitzers)

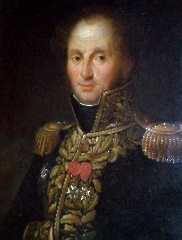
Gabriel Barbou

- 4th Division: General of Division Gabriel Barbou des Courières
  - 1st Brigade: General of Brigade Jean-Claude Moreau
    - 8th Light Infantry Regiment (1,450 in the 3rd & 4th Battalions)
    - 18th Light Infantry Regiment (1,400 in the 3rd & 4th Battalions)
    - 5th Line Infantry Regiment (1,400 in the 3rd & 4th Battalions)
    - 11th Line Infantry Regiment (700 in the 4th Battalion)
  - 2nd Brigade: General of Brigade Claude Roize
    - 23rd Line Infantry Regiment (1,400 in the 3rd & 4th Battalions)
    - 60th Line Infantry Regiment (1,400 in the 3rd & 4th Battalions)
    - 79th Line Infantry Regiment (1,350 in the 3rd & 4th Battalions)
    - 87th Line Infantry Regiment (1,400 in the 3rd & 4th Battalions)
  - Attached Artillery: (12 guns)
    - Foot artillery company (four 8-pound cannons, two 6-inch (150 mm) howitzers)
    - Foot artillery company (four 4-pound cannons, two 6-inch (150 mm) howitzers)

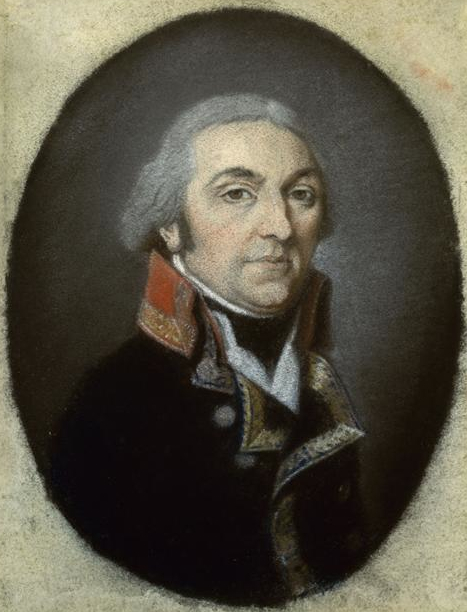
Louis Michel Sahuc

- Light Cavalry Division: General of Division Louis Michel Antoine Sahuc
  - Brigade: General of Brigade Joseph Pagès
    - 6th Chasseurs à Cheval Regiment (600 in 4 squadrons)
    - 8th Chasseurs à Cheval Regiment (850 in 4 squadrons)
    - 25th Chasseurs à Cheval Regiment (600 in 4 squadrons)
    - 6th Hussar Regiment (750 in 4 squadrons)
  - Attached Artillery: (6 guns)
    - Horse artillery company (four 4-pound cannons, two 6-inch (150 mm) howitzers)
- 1st Italian Division: General of Division Filippo Severoli
  - 1st Brigade: General of Brigade Antoine-Louis-Ignace Bonfanti
    - 1st Italian Line Infantry Regiment (2,800 in 4 battalions)
    - 2nd Italian Line Infantry Regiment (700 in the 3rd Battalion)
  - 2nd Brigade: General of Brigade Luigi Gaspare Peyri
    - 7th Italian Line Infantry Regiment (2,100 in the 2nd, 3rd & 4th Battalions)
    - Dalmatian Infantry Regiment (1,400 in 2 battalions)
    - Italian Chasseurs à Cheval Regiment (125 in 1 squadron)
  - Attached Artillery: (12 guns, 450)
- Italian foot artillery company (four 6-pound cannons, two 6-inch (150 mm) howitzers)
- Italian foot artillery company (four 6-pound cannons, two 6-inch (150 mm) howitzers)

=== Not present at Sacile ===
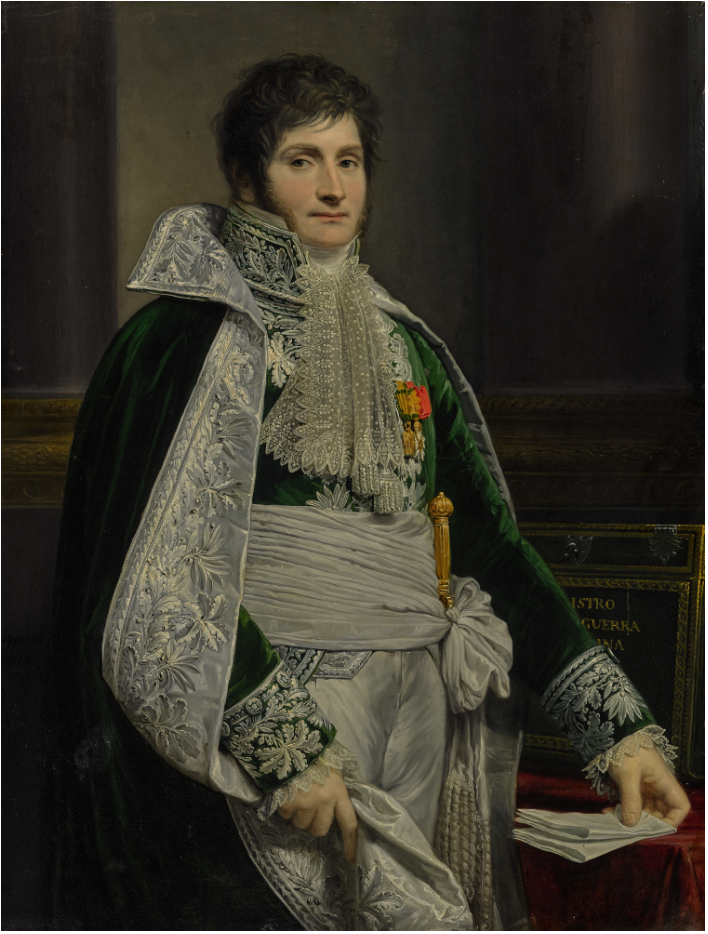
Achille Fontanelli

- 2nd Italian Division: General of Division Achille Fontanelli
  - 1st Brigade: General of Brigade Joseph François Benigne Julhien
    - 1st Italian Light Infantry Regiment (1,400 in 2 battalions)
    - 2nd Italian Light Infantry Regiment (1,400 in 2 battalions)
    - 3rd Italian Line Infantry Regiment (2,800 in 4 battalions)
  - 2nd Brigade: General of Brigade Antoine Marc Augustin Bertoletti
    - 4th Italian Line Infantry Regiment (1,400 in 2 battalions)
    - Istrian Jagers (700 in 1 battalion)
    - Italian Chasseurs à Cheval Regiment (250 in 2 squadrons)
  - Attached Artillery: (12 guns, 450)
    - Italian foot artillery company (four 6-pound cannons, two 6-inch (150 mm) howitzers)
    - Italian foot artillery company (four 6-pound cannons, two 6-inch (150 mm) howitzers)

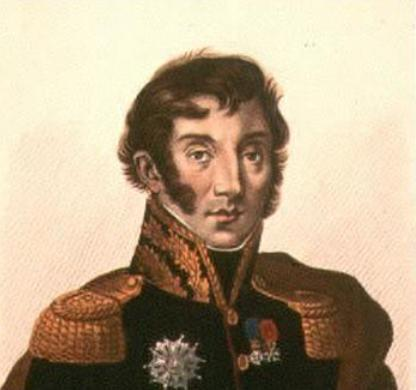
Jean Lamarque

- Division Lamarque: General of Division Jean Maximilien Lamarque
  - 1st Brigade: General of Brigade Léonard Huard de Saint-Aubin
    - 13th Line Infantry Regiment (2,800 in 4 battalions)
    - 112th Line Infantry Regiment (2,100 in 3 battalions)
  - 2nd Brigade: General of Brigade Louis Alméras
    - 29th Line Infantry Regiment (2,800 in 4 battalions)
    - 42nd Line Infantry Regiment (700 in the 4th Battalion)
  - Attached Artillery: (12 guns)
    - Foot artillery company (four 8-pound cannons, two 6-inch (150 mm) howitzers, 200)
    - Foot artillery company (four 4-pound cannons, two 6-inch (150 mm) howitzers, 140)

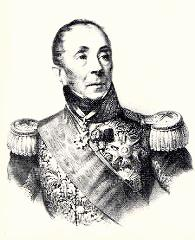
Emmanuel Grouchy

- 1st Dragoon Division: General of Division Emmanuel Grouchy
  - Brigade: General of Brigade François Guerin d'Etoquigny
    - 7th Dragoon Regiment (700 in 4 squadrons)
    - 30th Dragoon Regiment (950 in 4 squadrons)
    - Reine Dragoon Regiment (700 in 4 squadrons)
  - Attached Artillery: (6 guns)
    - Horse artillery company (four 4-pound cannons, two 6-inch (150 mm) howitzers, 125)
- 2nd Dragoon Division: General of Division Charles Joseph Randon de Malboissière de Pully
  - Brigade: General of Brigade Pierre Poinsot
    - 23rd Dragoon Regiment (600 in 4 squadrons)
    - 28th Dragoon Regiment (450 in 4 squadrons)
    - 29th Dragoon Regiment (600 in 4 squadrons)

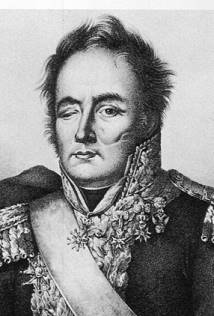
Pierre Durutte

- Division Durutte: General of Division Pierre François Joseph Durutte
  - 1st Brigade:
    - 22nd Light Infantry Regiment (1,400 in the 3rd & 4th Battalions)
    - 23rd Line Infantry Regiment (2,800 in 4 battalions)
  - 2nd Brigade:
    - 62nd Line Infantry Regiment (2,800 in 4 battalions)
  - Attached Artillery: (6 guns)
    - Foot artillery company (four 6-pound cannons, two 6-inch (150 mm) howitzers)
- Royal Italian Guard: General of Brigade Teodoro Lechi
  - 1st Brigade: General of Brigade Pietro Luigi Viani
    - Guard Velites Infantry Regiment (800 in 1 battalion)
    - Guards d'Honneur Squadron (175)
  - 2nd Brigade: General of Brigade Teodoro Lechi
    - Guard Chasseurs Infantry Regiment (800 in 1 battalion)
    - Guard Grenadiers Infantry Regiment (800 in 1 battalion)
    - Guard Dragoon Regiment (275 in 2 squadrons)
  - Attached Artillery: (6 guns, 238)
    - Italian foot artillery company (four 6-pound cannons, two 6-inch (150 mm) howitzers)
    - Sappers (350 in 3 companies)

== Austrian Army Order of Battle ==
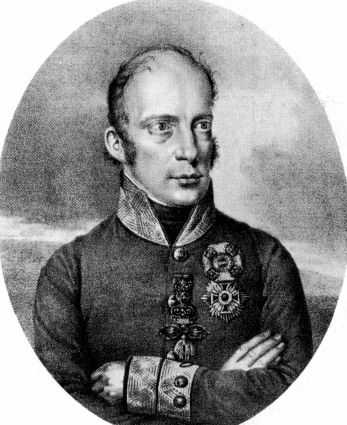
Archduke John

Army of Inner Austria: General der Kavallerie Archduke John of Austria

- Chief of staff: Oberst (colonel) Laval Nugent von Westmeath
- Artillery Director: General-Major Anton Reisner
- Advance Guard: Feldmarschall-Leutnant Johann Maria Philipp Frimont
  - Brigade: General-Major Josef Schmidt
    - Archduke Franz Karl Infantry Regiment Nr. 52 (1 battalion)
    - Franz Jellacic Infantry Regiment Nr. 62 (1 battalion)
  - Brigade: General-Major Joseph Wetzel
    - 1st Banal Grenz Infantry Regiment Nr. 10 (1 2/3 battalions)
    - Ott Hussar Regiment Nr. 5 (2 squadrons)

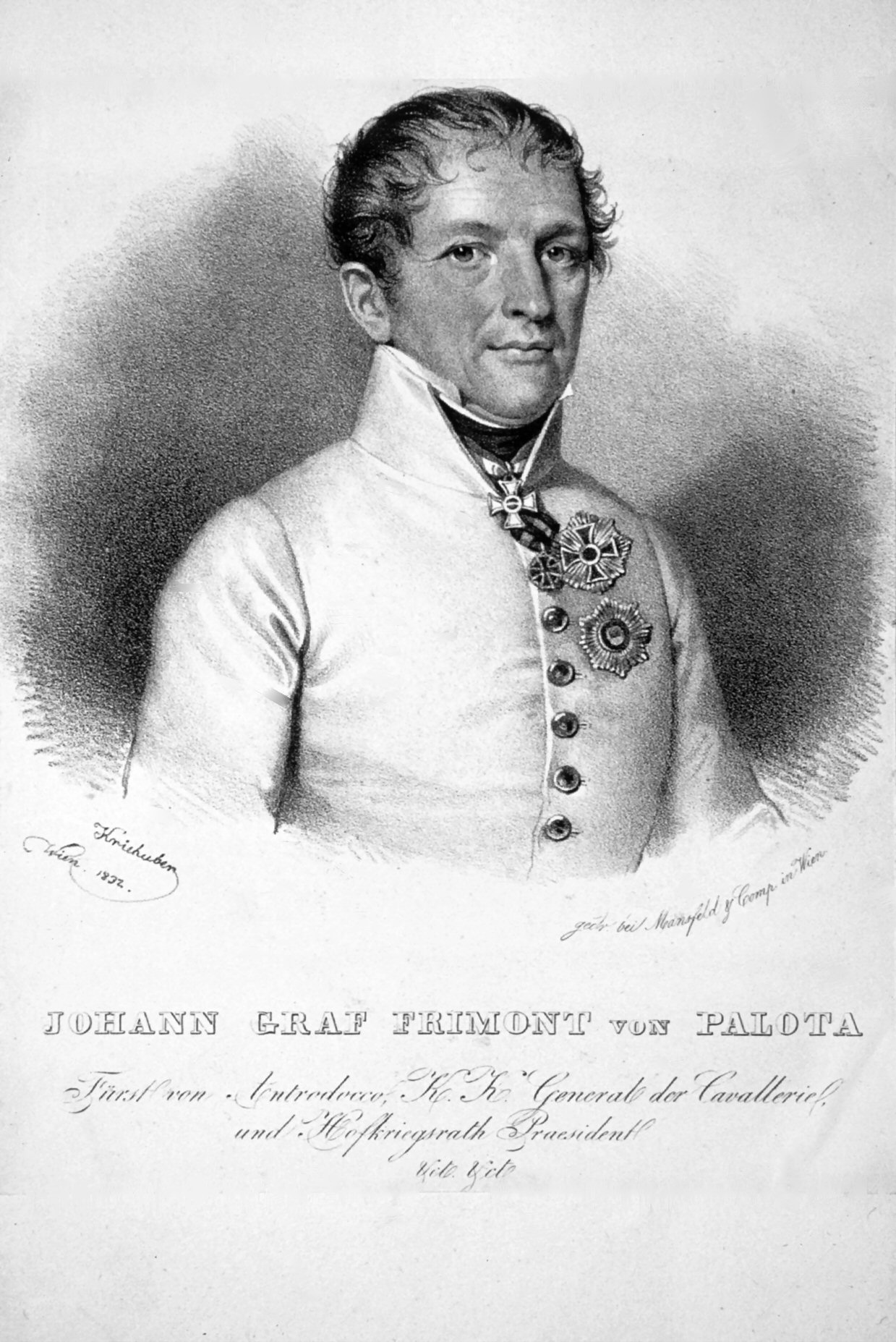
Johann Frimont

- VIII Armeekorps: Feldmarschall-Leutnant Albert Gyulai
  - Corps Artillery: Major Johann von Fasching
    - 12-pound position battery (6 guns)
    - 3-pound brigade battery (8 guns)
  - Brigade: General-Major Hieronymus Karl Graf von Colloredo-Mansfeld
    - Strassoldo Infantry Regiment Nr. 27 (2 battalions)
    - Saint-Julien Infantry Regiment Nr. 61 (2 battalions)
    - 3-pound brigade battery (8 guns)
  - Brigade: General-Major Anton Gajoli
    - Franz Jellacic Infantry Regiment Nr. 62 (2 battalions)
    - Johann Jellacic Infantry Regiment Nr. 53 (2 battalions)
    - 2nd Banal Grenz Infantry Regiment Nr. 11 (1 battalion)
    - half Grenz 3-pound brigade battery (4 guns)
  - Brigade: Oberst Wilhelm von Fulda †
    - Ott Hussar Regiment Nr. 5 (4 squadrons)
    - Hohenzollern Chevau-léger Regiment Nr. 2 (4 squadrons)

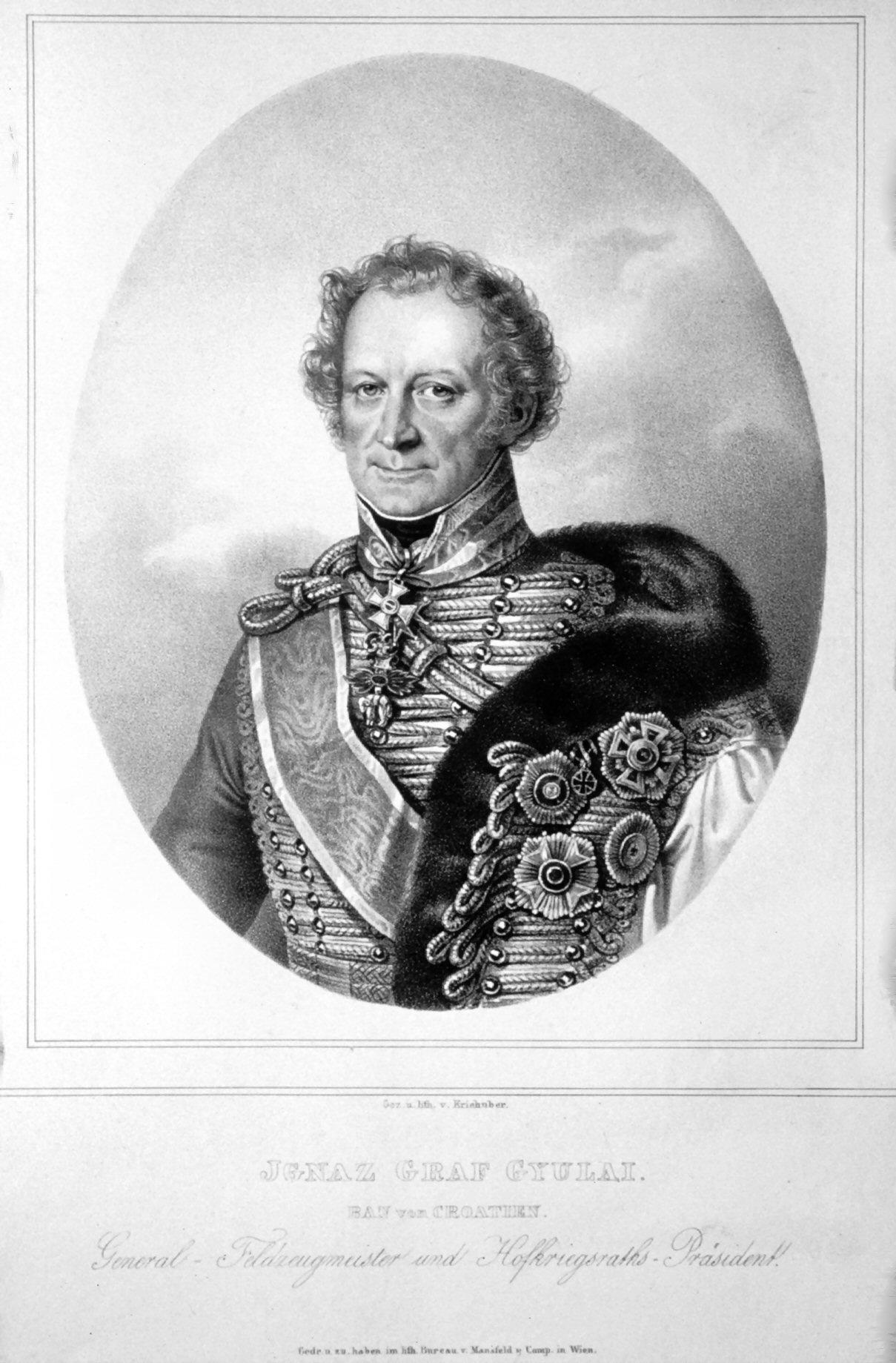
Ignaz Gyulai

- IX Armeekorps: Feldmarschall-Leutnant Ignaz Gyulai
  - Corps Artillery: Oberstleutnant Johann von Callot
    - 12-pound position battery (6 guns)
    - 6-pound brigade battery (8 guns)
    - 3-pound brigade battery (8 guns)
  - Brigade: General-Major Johann Kalnássy
    - Simbschen Infantry Regiment Nr. 43 (3 battalions)
    - 3-pound brigade battery (8 guns)
  - Brigade: General-Major Alois von Gavasini
    - Reisky Infantry Regiment Nr. 13 (3 battalions)
    - Ottocaner Grenz Infantry Regiment Nr. 2 (1 1/2 battalions)
  - Brigade: General-Major Franz Marziani
    - Alvinczi Infantry Regiment Nr. 19 (3 battalions)
    - Oguliner Grenz Infantry Regiment Nr. 3 (2 battalions)
    - 3-pound brigade battery (8 guns)
  - Detachment: Oberst Anton Volkmann
    - Banal Grenz Infantry Regiment Nr. 2 (1 battalion)
    - Johann Jellacic Infantry Regiment Nr. 53 (1 battalion)
    - Ott Hussar Regiment Nr. 5 (2 squadrons)
    - Archduke Joseph Hussar Regiment Nr. 2 (2 squadrons)
  - Brigade: General-Major Johann Peter Kleinmayer
    - Szluiner Grenz Infantry Regiment Nr. 4 (2 battalions)
    - Salamon Grenadier Battalion
    - Janusch Grenadier Battalion
    - Chimani Grenadier Battalion
    - Mühlen Grenadier Battalion
    - 3-pound brigade battery (8 guns)
  - Brigade: General-Major Ignaz Sebottendorf
    - Graz Landwehr (3 battalions)
    - Dumontet Freikorps battalion
- Cavalry Division: Feldmarschall-Leutnant Christian Wolfskehl von Reichenberg
  - Brigade: General-Major Ignaz Splényi
    - Frimont Hussar Regiment Nr. 9 (4 squadrons)
    - Archduke Joseph Hussar Regiment Nr. 2 (6 squadrons)
  - Brigade: General-Major Johann Hager von Altensteig
    - Hohenlohe Dragoon Regiment Nr. 2 (6 squadrons)
    - Savoy Dragoon Regiment Nr. 5 (6 squadrons)
