= Alméras =

Alméras is a French surname. Notable people with the surname include:

- Baron Louis Alméras (1768–1828) French general
- Henri Alméras (1892–1965) French perfumer for Patou
- Jacques Alméras (born 1949), French racing driver
- Jean-Marie Alméras (born 1943), French former racing driver
  - Alméras Frères, a racing team founded by brothers Jean-Marie and Jacques

== See also ==
- Antonio Fabré y Almerás (1728–1806), Spanish monk
