= Luigi Gaspare Peyri =

- Born: 1758; Mantua, Republic of Venice
- Died: 1822 (aged 63–64) unknown
- Allegiance: Italy
- Branch: Infantry
- Rank: General of Division
- Conflicts: Peninsular War; Battle of Campo Tenese; Battle of Maida; Battle of Sacile; Battle of Piave River; Battle of Raab; Siege of Figueras; Siege of Valencia; Battle of Lützen

Luigi Gaspare Peyri or Louis Gaspard Balthazar Pierre Léon Marie Peyri (1758 – 1822) became a general officer in the army of the Kingdom of Italy which was a satellite of Napoleon's First French Empire. He led Italians, Swiss, and Poles in a number of important actions in the War of the Fourth Coalition, the War of the Fifth Coalition, and the Peninsular War.

== Maida ==
Peyri hailed from Mantua.

At the Battle of Maida on 4 July 1806, Peyri commanded a 'Foreign' brigade made up of two battalions of the Polish-Italian Legion (937 men) and the 4th Battalion of the 1st Swiss Regiment (630 men), part of Verdier's Division.

== 1809 Campaign ==
In 1809 he commanded a brigade of Severoli’s 1st Italian Division under Eugène de Beauharnais in Italy, seeing action at Sacile 15/16 April and Raab 15th-16th. He was in Baraguey d’Hilliers’ Reserve Corps at Raab & Pressburg, July. He served in the Tyrol in August, and in Carinthia, October.

== Spain ==
Promoted to Géneral de Division, he was given command of the Italian Division in Marshal Louis Gabriel Suchet's Armée du Aragon and served at the siege of Tarragona in June 1811. Peyri's 4,892-man division consisted of two battalions each of the Kingdom of Italy 1st Light, 2nd Light, 4th Line, 5th Line, and 6th Line Infantry Regiments. The Royal Chasseurs à Cheval and Napoleone Dragoon Regiments were also attached. On 25 July 1811, Suchet won a victory in the Battle of Montserrat, in which Peyri did not participate. In August, Peyri led his division in the suppression of guerillas in southern Aragon. The Spanish partisans were chased away from Teruel and forced to disperse into the mountains.

== 1813 campaign ==
Replaced by Palombini in September 1811, In April 1813 he was given command of the 15th Division of the reconstituted Italian Corps under Eugène, Napoleon ordered Peyri's division to march from Italy to Germany. He served in Bertrand’s IV Corps at Lutzen 2 May, then with 8,000 men was heavily defeated by Barclay de Tolly at Koenigswertha (Königswartha) on the 19th and taken prisoner. He was replaced by Achille Fontanelli.
