= Battle of Sacile =

1809 battle during the War of the Fifth Coalition

- Part of the War of the Fifth Coalition
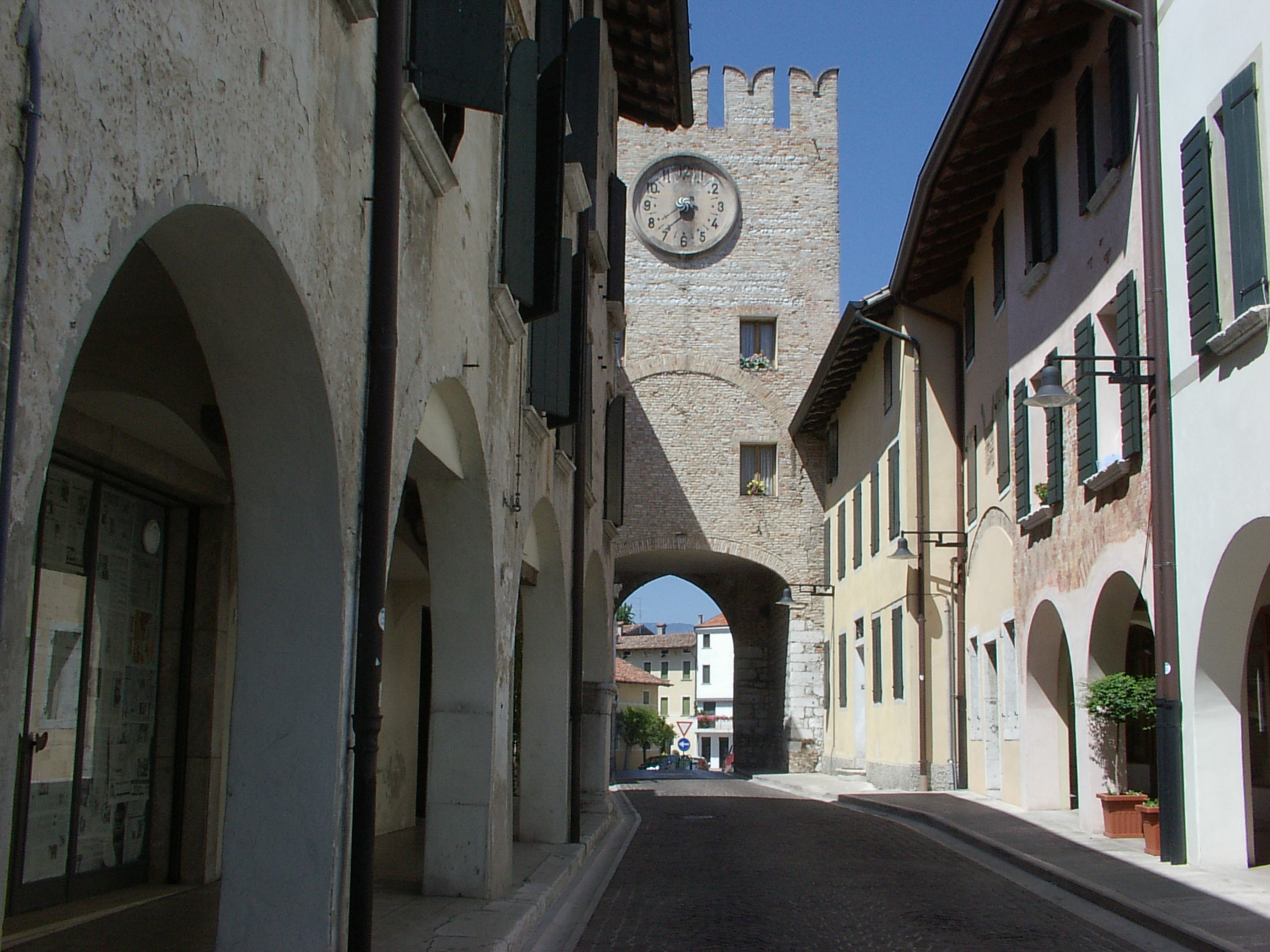
- Porcia, the focus of major fighting
Date	15–16 April 1809
Location	Sacile, modern-day Italy 45°58′N 12°30′E
Result	Austrian victory

Belligerents
(France) First French Empire (Kingdom of Italy (Napoleonic)) Kingdom of Italy	Austrian Empire

Commanders and leaders
(Kingdom of Italy (Napoleonic)) Eugène de Beauharnais	(Austrian Empire) Archduke John

Strength
37,050, 54 guns	39,000, 55–61 guns

Casualties and losses
Pordenone: 2,500, 4 guns Sacile: 6,500, 19 guns	Pordenone: 253; Sacile: 3,846–4,100

War of the Fifth Coalition
current battle
Napoleon in command
Napoleon not in command

The Battle of Sacile (also known as the Battle of Fontana Fredda) on 16 April 1809 and its companion Clash at Pordenone on 15 April saw an Austrian army commanded by Archduke John of Austria defeat a Franco-Italian army led by Eugène de Beauharnais and force it to retreat. Sacile proved to be the most notable victory of John's career. The action took place east of the Livenza River near Sacile in modern-day Italy during the War of the Fifth Coalition, part of the Napoleonic Wars.

In April 1809, Archduke John quickly invaded Venetia in northeastern Italy. On 15 April at Pordenone, the Austrian advance guard routed the French rear guard, inflicting heavy losses. Undeterred by this setback and believing he enjoyed a numerical superiority over his opponents, Eugène attacked the Austrians east of Sacile the following day. Though the two sides were equal in numbers of foot soldiers, the Austrians possessed a two-to-one advantage in cavalry, and this turned out to be a key factor in their victory.

Eugène withdrew his army 130 kilometres (81 mi) to a defensible position at Verona on the Adige river, where he reorganized his army and received reinforcements. At Verona, the Franco-Italian army was secure from Archduke John's army advancing from the east and a second Austrian column threatening it from the Tyrol in the north. By the end of April, news of French victories in the Danube valley caused John to fall back to the east, with Eugène in pursuit.

== Background ==
=== Austrian strategy ===
In the early part of 1809, the Austrian Empire of Emperor Francis I determined to go to war against Emperor Napoleon I's First French Empire. Austria massed her main army in the Danube valley under Generalissimo Archduke Charles. Though Italy was considered a minor theater, Charles and the Hofkriegsrat (Austrian high command) assigned two corps to the Army of Inner Austria and placed General der Kavallerie Archduke John in command.

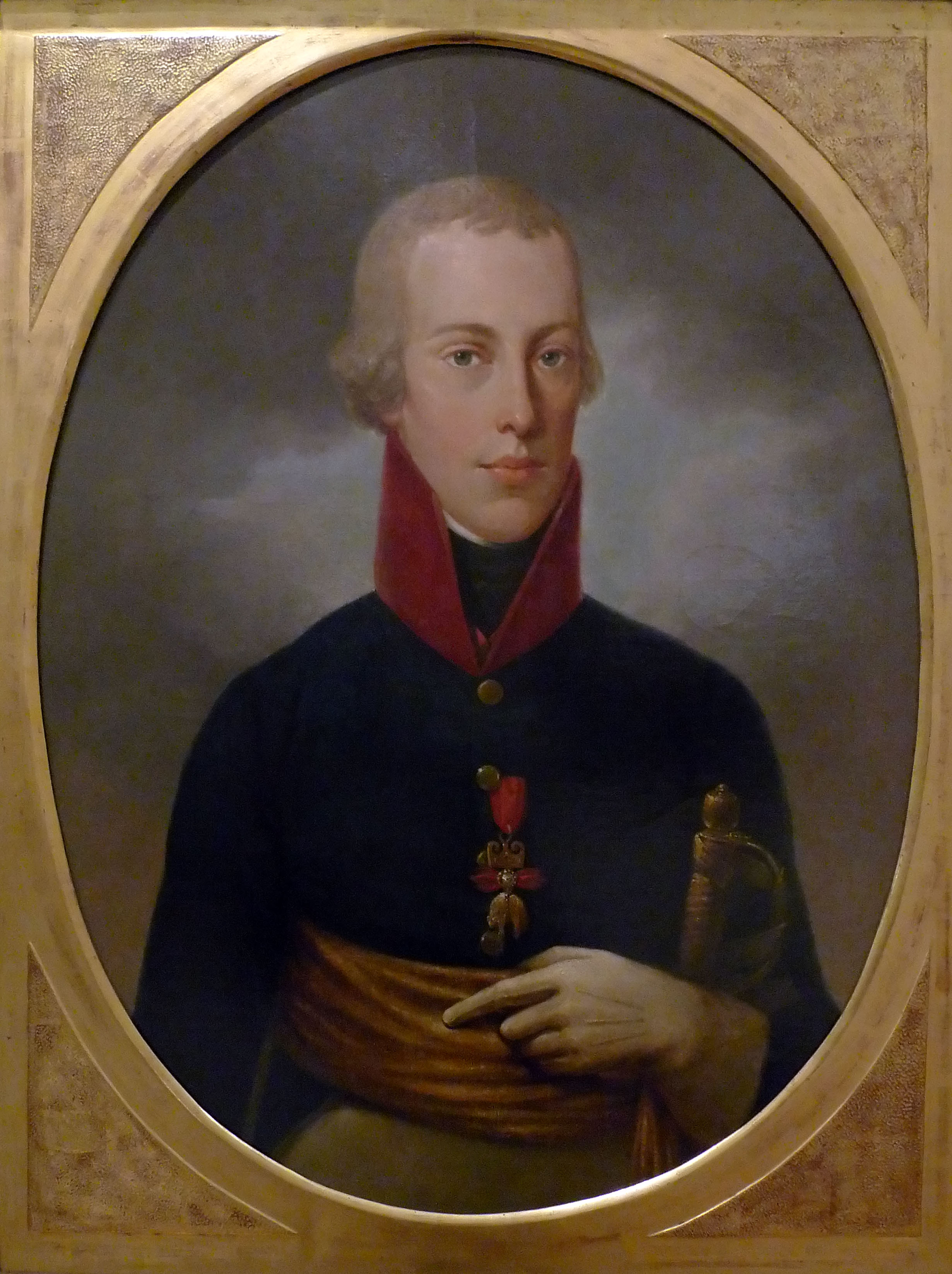
Archduke John in 1800

Regarded as "incompetent" by historian David G. Chandler, Archduke John had seen his first army utterly smashed by French General of Division Jean Moreau at the Battle of Hohenlinden on 3 December 1800. In Moreau's subsequent pursuit, John's army became so demoralized that it was scarcely able to defend itself and suffered huge losses in prisoners and weapons. During the War of the Third Coalition, he had done better. After Napoleon wiped out Feldmarschall-Leutnant Karl Mack von Leiberich's Austrian army in the 1805 Ulm Campaign, John's army beat a hasty retreat eastward from its position in the mountainous Vorarlberg. He successfully linked up with the Army of Italy, led by his brother, Archduke Charles. Unfortunately for Austria, Napoleon's crushing victory at the Battle of Austerlitz ended the war before Charles and John could intervene in the Danube valley.

At the beginning of the 1809 war, John controlled Feldmarschall-Leutnant Johann Gabriel Chasteler de Courcelles's VIII Armeekorps of 24,500 infantry and 2,600 cavalry, and Feldmarschall-Leutnant Ignaz Gyulai's IX Armeekorps of 22,200 infantry and 2,000 cavalry. The VIII Armeekorps assembled at Villach in Carinthia, while the IX Armeekorps massed to the south at Ljubljana (Laibach) in Carniola (now Slovenia). General-major Andreas Stoichevich with 10,000 troops faced General of Division Auguste Marmont's XI Corps in Dalmatia, a French possession since 1806. A body of 26,000 Landwehr stood ready to man garrisons and defend the Austrian heartland. John planned to have the VIII Armeekorps move southwest from Villach and the IX Armeekorps advance northwest from Ljubljana. The two forces would unite near Cividale del Friuli.

Another source gave a somewhat different Austrian organization at the outbreak of war. Chasteler's VIII Armeekorps possessed 20,100 men and 62 guns in two divisions. Feldmarschall-Leutnant Albert Gyulay led the 1st Division while Feldmarschall-Leutnant Johann Maria Philipp Frimont commanded the 2nd Division. Ignaz Gyulai 's IX Armeekorps counted 22,290 soldiers and 86 guns in three divisions. The 1st Division was led by Feldmarschall-Leutnant Franz Gorup von Besanez, the 2nd Division was under Feldmarschall-Leutnant Christian Wolfskehl von Reichenberg, and the 3rd Division was directed by Feldmarschall-Leutnant Vinko Knežević. Feldmarschall-Leutnant Guido Lippa was responsible for 30,000 Landwehr and reserves. These numbers differ somewhat from Schneid's list and include Stoichevich's force as part of Knesevich's division.

Before the Austrians launched the war, the Tyrol flared in a spontaneous revolt. The German-speaking Tyrolese under leaders like Andreas Hofer began driving out the Bavarian garrisons. Desiring to aid the rebellion, Charles ordered John to send Chasteler and 10,000 Austrian troops to help the Tyrolese. Ignaz Gyulai's brother Albert replaced Chasteler as the commander of a reduced VIII Armeekorps. The organization of Chastler's force is shown in the Tyrol 1809 order of battle.

=== French strategy ===
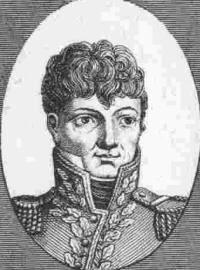
Jean Broussier

Aware that Austria probably intended to make war, Napoleon reinforced the Army of Italy under Eugène de Beauharnais, building the French component up to a strength of six infantry and three cavalry divisions. Many of these "French" troops were Italians, since portions of northwest Italy had been annexed to France. In addition, Viceroy Eugène formed three Italian infantry divisions. The Franco-Italian army counted 70,000 troops, though they were somewhat scattered across northern Italy.

Before 1809, Eugène never led so much as a regiment into battle, yet Napoleon entrusted him with command of the Army of Italy. To prepare his stepson Eugène for the role, the emperor advised him how to defend Italy in many detailed letters. He wrote that if the Austrians invaded in superior numbers, the viceroy was to give up the Isonzo River line and fall back to the Piave River. The emperor noted that the Adige river was a particularly important strategic position. Napoleon did not believe Austria would attack in April, and in any case, did not wish to provoke his enemy by concentrating his armies. Therefore, Eugène's army remained somewhat dispersed.

At the beginning of hostilities, the Franco-Italian troops were stationed in the following positions. The 1st Division of General of Division Jean-Mathieu Seras and the 2nd Division under General of Division Jean-Baptiste Broussier deployed behind the Isonzo River. General of Division Paul Grenier's 3rd Division and General of Division Jean Maximilien Lamarque's 5th Division assembled behind the Tagliamento river. The 4th Division of General of Division Gabriel Barbou des Courières and the 6th Division under General of Division Pierre François Joseph Durutte concentrated in north-central Italy. The three cavalry divisions and the Italian Guard organized behind the Adige river. The unit locations are listed exactly as they are mentioned in the text. However, it is more likely that Barbou was behind the Tagliamento and Lamarque in north-central Italy. Otherwise, there is no explanation why Lamarque was unable to reach the field of battle.

=== Operations ===
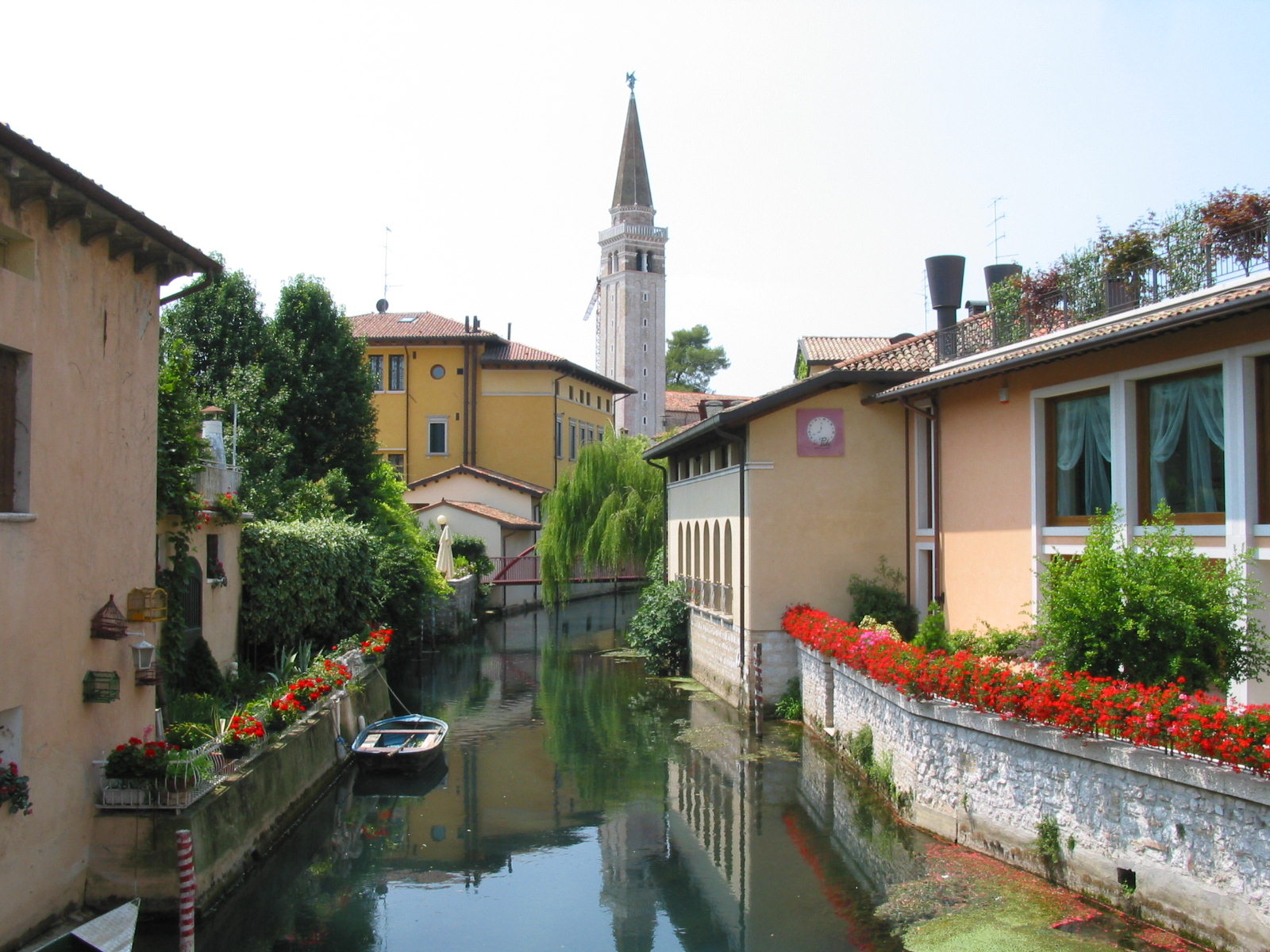
Eugène concentrated his army on the Livenza River at Sacile.

Archduke John's army invaded Italy on 10 April 1809, with the VIII Armeekorps advancing through Tarvisio and IX Armeekorps crossing the middle Isonzo. After unusually rapid marching for an Austrian army, Albert Gyulay's column captured Udine on 12 April, with Ignaz Gyulai's forces not far behind. Planning on concentrating his army behind the Tagliamento river, Eugène directed Seras and Broussier to slow down the Austrians. But the two divisions were unable to halt John's advance. Even so, Eugène believed his army was strong enough to beat the archduke in battle, so he ordered his divisions to assemble at Sacile on the Livenza River. Because of the Tyrolese revolt, the viceroy sent General of Division Achille Fontanelli's Italian division to Trento on the upper Adige with General of Division Louis Baraguey d'Hilliers in overall command.

By 14 April, Eugène massed six divisions near Sacile with Lamarque's infantry and General of Division Charles Randon de Pully's dragoons still distant. At this time, the Italian Guard, Durutte's infantry, and General of Division Emmanuel Grouchy's dragoons were still assembling on the Adige. Before the war, Eugène proposed to Napoleon that his infantry be formed into three corps, but the emperor had not replied to this request. Because of this, Eugène army fought the coming battle as a collection of divisions, which had a detrimental effect on command control. Meanwhile, John used small forces to mask the fortresses of Osoppo on the upper Tagliamento and Palmanova south of Udine. The Austrians reached Valvasone on the evening of 14 April, but John ordered a night march. Frimont's advance guard was in the lead, with VIII Armeekorps right behind. Slowed by the rainy weather, the IX Armeekorps lagged behind.

== Battle ==
The units and organizations of both armies are shown in the Sacile 1809 order of battle.

=== Pordenone ===
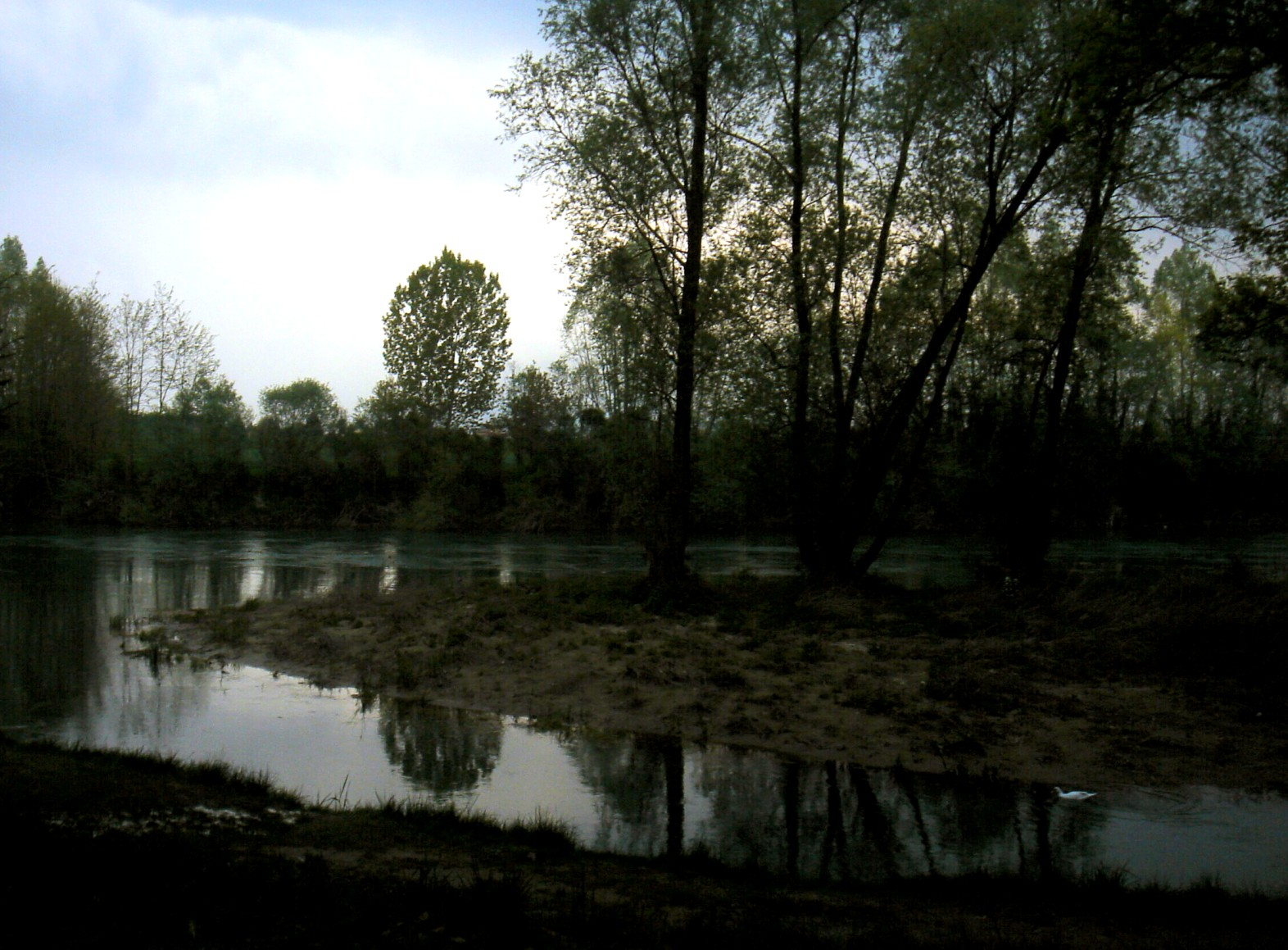
Seras and Severoli crossed the Livenza River near Brugnera.

On 15 April, Eugène ordered his army forward across the Livenza. The French divisions of Grenier and Barbou moved through Sacile, while Seras' French and General of Division Filippo Severoli's Italian division crossed at Brugnera and moved toward the village of Tamai. Broussier's division crossed the Livenza to the north of Sacile. Meanwhile, General of Division Louis Michel Antoine Sahuc's rear guard consisting of light cavalry and the 35th Line Infantry Regiment deployed 12 km to the east of Sacile near Pordenone. Sahuc's patrols brought word that Archduke John's troops were across the Tagliamento, but because Seras and Broussier had not kept a close watch on the advancing Austrians during their withdrawal, Eugène was unsure of his enemy's strength.

Thanks to his scouts, Archduke John had a clear picture of his opponent's army. He ordered Frimont's advance guard to attack the French soldiers at Pordenone in the morning. At 6:00 am, the Austrians clashed with Sahuc's cavalry patrols. General-major Joseph von Wetzel's Grenz brigade attacked across the Noncello (Foncello) stream on the east side of the town, attracting the attention of the defending infantry. When General-major Josef von Schmidt's line brigade came down from the northeast, the French were compelled to stretch the 35th Line to cover the north side of town. Sahuc formed his horsemen north of the town, hoping to catch the Austrian attackers in the flank. But it was the French cavalry who were flanked when Frimont fell on them with four regiments of cavalry, routing them. Without cavalry support, the infantry in the town were forced to pull out. Based on this source, Wetzel probably led the 1st Banal Grenz. That leaves Schmidt to command the two line infantry battalions.

At Pordenone, the Austrians lost 221 killed and wounded plus 32 captured out of a total of 5,900 men and 15 guns. French losses were much heavier, 500 killed and wounded, plus 2,000 men and 4 guns captured out of 4,800 troops and 6 guns engaged. Many infantrymen of the 35th Line surrendered and the regiment lost an eagle and two colors. Historian Digby Smith wrote that the 35th was "practically destroyed". In addition to the three battalions of the 35th Line, the 6th Hussar and the 6th Chasseurs à Cheval Regiments were engaged on the French side. The Austrians committed one battalion of the Archduke Franz Karl IR Nr. 52, one battalion of the Franz Jellacic IR Nr. 62, and two battalions of the 1st Banal Grenz IR Nr. 10 to action. Six squadrons of the Ott Hussar Regiment Nr. 5, four squadrons of the Frimont Hussar Regiment Nr. 9, and two squadrons of the Hohenzollern Chevau-léger Regiment Nr. 2 were also involved. Smith said the French 8th Hussars were engaged, but this is obviously an error and he meant the 6th Hussars.

=== Sacile ===
Aware of the French buildup at Tamai to the southeast of his positions, Archduke John posted Albert Gyulai's VIII Armeekorps and Frimont's Advance Guard to defend Pordenone and Porcia. Ignaz Gyulai's IX Armeekorps, which had arrived late in the day of the 15th, bivouacked just west of Pordenone. While his left flank held off the expected Franco-Italian attacks on Porcia, John planned to send Ignaz Gyulai first to Roveredo in Piano then southwest in a lunge at Fontanafredda and Ranzano.

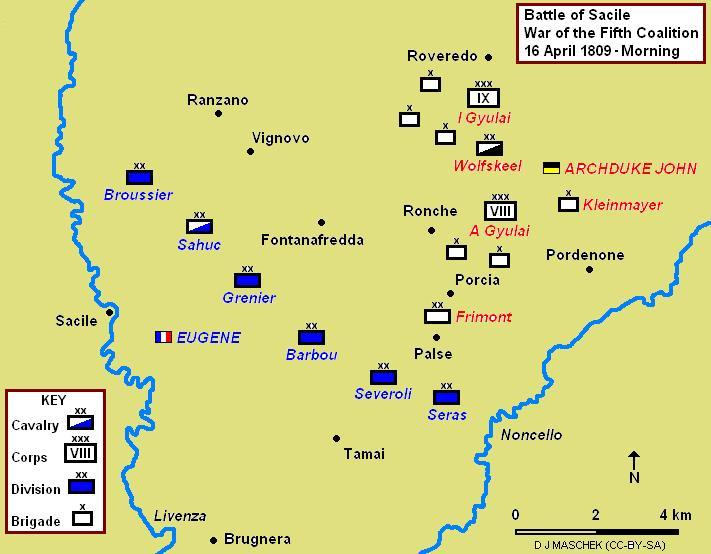
Battle of Sacile, showing morning positions. Eugène was unaware of the presence of the IX Armeekorps.

Still unaware of the presence of the IX Armeekorps, Eugène believed he faced only 20,000 Austrians. He boasted, "In one day I will retake all of the territory I have abandoned at the moment." He knew that the Austrian cavalry enjoyed a numerical superiority over his own horsemen. Since the terrain on the Austrian left flank was unsuitable for mounted action, he determined to move against it. He appointed Seras to command both his own and Severoli's divisions in the attack. Eugène ordered Barbou's division to cooperate in the assault while Grenier pushed forward near Fontanafredda. Broussier held the left flank with Sahuc's troopers between him and Grenier. A four-battalion task force watched for an envelopment on the far left flank.

Covered by an artillery barrage, Seras moved out at 9:00 am with his two divisions. They quickly seized Palse and began assaulting Porcia. Frimont unleashed the Ott Hussars, forcing Seras to pause in his advance. This bought time for John to send VIII Armeekorps in a counterattack against the Franco-Italians in which Severoli was wounded and his division nearly broken. At this moment, Barbou joined the battle and his division first checked the Austrians, then drove Frimont's troops out of Porcia. Seeing his attack having trouble overcoming the Austrian left flank, Eugène ordered Grenier to leave Fontanafredda and throw his division into the battle on the right flank. Sahuc and Broussier shifted to the right to fill the gap in the Franco-Italian center.

Meanwhile, Ignaz Gyulai began his maneuver, leaving General-major Johann Kleinmayer's grenadier reserve to help defend the left flank. Reaching Roveredo around noon, he veered to the southwest, launching three infantry brigades at Eugène's thinned-out center about 1:30 pm. With General-major Anton Gajoli's brigade holding Grenier's division near Ronche, the IX Armeekorps threatened to overwhelm Broussier. Grenier rapidly disengaged most of his troops and sent them back to defend Fontanafredda, while Broussier counterattacked near Vignovo. In the center, there was bitter fighting near Ronche as the French repelled one attack only to have the Austrians mount a second one. Eugène refused to commit Sahuc's cavalry in the face of the Austrian superiority in cavalry. During this crisis, Seras lost Porcia to an Austrian attack.

Seeing that his main attack failed, Eugène ordered a withdrawal at 5:00 pm. On the right flank, Severoli and Barbou's troops covered the withdrawal. Historian Frederick C. Schneid believed that a mass cavalry attack "could have smashed" Grenier and Broussier, but Ignaz Gyulai kept Wolfskehl's cavalry behind his infantry. Instead, Sahuc's threatened attack pinned the IX Armeekorps long enough for Broussier and Grenier to get away. The two divisions retreated in square, each division lending support to the other. They finally reached the Livenza after numerous clashes with their Austrian pursuers. Nightfall allowed the two divisions to safely cross to the west side of the river. Seras, Barbou, and Severoli crossed the Livenza at Brugnera the following morning.

== Result ==
The Franco-Italian army suffered 3,000 killed and wounded at Sacile. An additional 3,500 soldiers, 19 guns, 23 ammunition wagons, and two colors fell into the hands of the Austrians. Pagès was wounded and captured while Teste was wounded. According to Smith, the Austrians lost 2,617 killed and wounded, 532 captured, and 697 missing. Schneid listed Austrian losses as 3,600 killed and wounded and 500 captured.

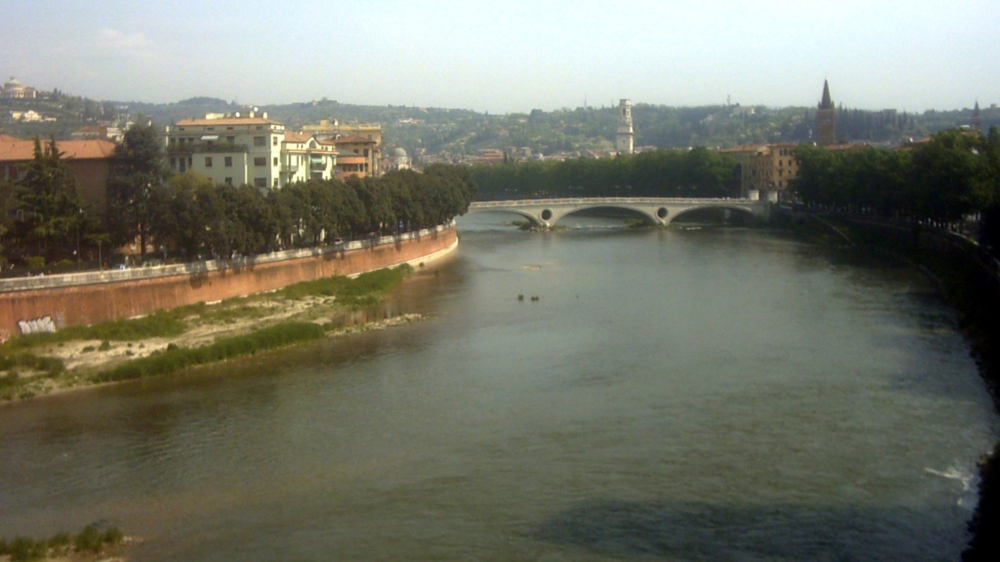
Eugène retreated to the Adige at Verona.

Archduke John decided not to follow up his victory, since the VIII Armeekorps was mauled in the fighting near Porcia and the IX Armeekorps cavalry was worn out. Instead, Frimont trailed after the Army of Italy with his advance guard. Schneid wrote, "John's failure to pursue one week after Sacile was one of his greatest blunders".

On the evening of the battle, Lamarque and Pully reached Conegliano after being delayed by wet weather and bad roads. Eugène used the two divisions as a rear guard as his defeated troops straggled back to the Piave. He also sent Barbou and ten battalions to reinforce Venice, forcing John to detach a force to mask the Adriatic Sea port. The Franco-Italian army held the line of the Piave for four days, but fell back toward the Brenta River on 21 April. When the Army of Inner Austria arrived near Verona on 28 April, it found Eugène in a strong defensive position behind the Adige. Meanwhile, Chasteler captured Innsbruck on 12 April and Trento on the upper Adige on 23 April. The Tyrol detachment advanced as far as Roveredo on 26 April before being halted by Baraguey d'Hilliers.

Napoleon was enraged at his stepson's fumbling and he proposed to replace him with Marshal Joachim Murat who was King of Naples at the time. Nothing came of this threat because by the time his letter arrived, Eugène was advancing again. The viceroy had accumulated reinforcements as he retreated, so that his army numbered 60,000 by the time it reached the Adige. Meanwhile, John's army shrank as it detached a force to observe Venice and a brigade to reinforce Chasteler. News of Napoleon's victory over Archduke Charles at the Battle of Eckmühl on 22 April caused Archduke John to fall back toward Austria at the beginning of May. The next engagements between John and Eugène were the Battle of Caldiero in the last days of April and the Battle of Piave River on 8 May.

== Notes ==
Preceded by Battles of Bergisel	Napoleonic Wars; Battle of Sacile	Succeeded by Battle of Teugen-Hausen
