= Louis Michel Antoine Sahuc =

Louis-Michel-Antoine Sahuc
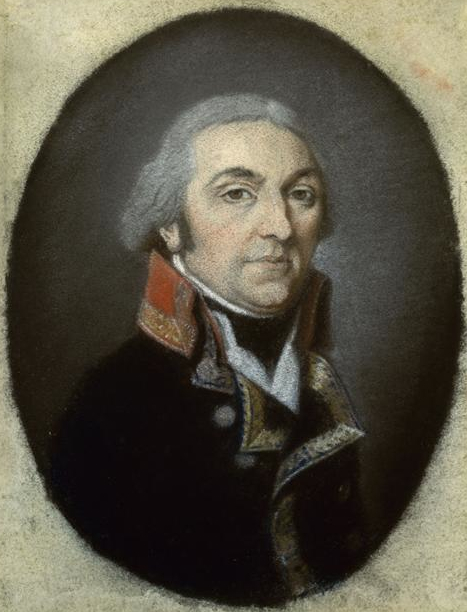
- General Louis-Michel-Antoine Sahuc
- Born: 7 January 1755; Mello, Oise, France
- Died: 24 October 1813 (aged 58); Frankfurt-on-the-Main, Germany
- Military career
- Allegiance: France
- Branch: Cavalry
- Service years: 1772–1813
- Rank: Général de Division
- Conflicts: French Revolutionary Wars; Napoleonic Wars
- Awards: Légion d'Honneur; Count of the Empire
- Other work: Corps législatif

Louis-Michel-Antoine, comte Sahuc (French pronunciation: [lwi miʃɛl ɑ̃twan kɔ̃t də sa.yk]), was a French army general born 7 January 1755 – died 24 October 1813, joined the French Royal Army and spent 20 years there before fighting in the French Revolutionary Wars. He rose to command a French cavalry regiment and later became a general officer. During the Napoleonic Wars he held important cavalry commands in three of Emperor Napoleon I of France's wars.

In the early years of the French Revolution Sahuc was appointed to lead a Chasseurs à Cheval regiment and later commanded a brigade. Under Napoleon, he commanded a cavalry brigade in the 1805 campaign. During the 1806-7 campaign he led a dragoon division. In 1809, he directed a light cavalry division in Italy and at the Battle of Wagram. For a few years afterward he served as a lawmaker but was recalled up to military duty. He died in the 1813 typhus epidemic in Germany. Sahuc is one of the Names inscribed under the Arc de Triomphe.

== Early career ==
Sahuc was born on 7 January 1755 at Mello, Oise in France and joined the army of the Old Regime in 1772. At the beginning of the French Revolution he became an officer in the Army of the North. Later he transferred to the Army of Sambre-et-Meuse and was appointed Chef de brigade (colonel) of the 1st Chasseurs à Cheval Regiment on 10 July 1794. He became a général de brigade on 21 April 1799 during the War of the Second Coalition. He fought at the Battle of Stockach on 3 May 1800.

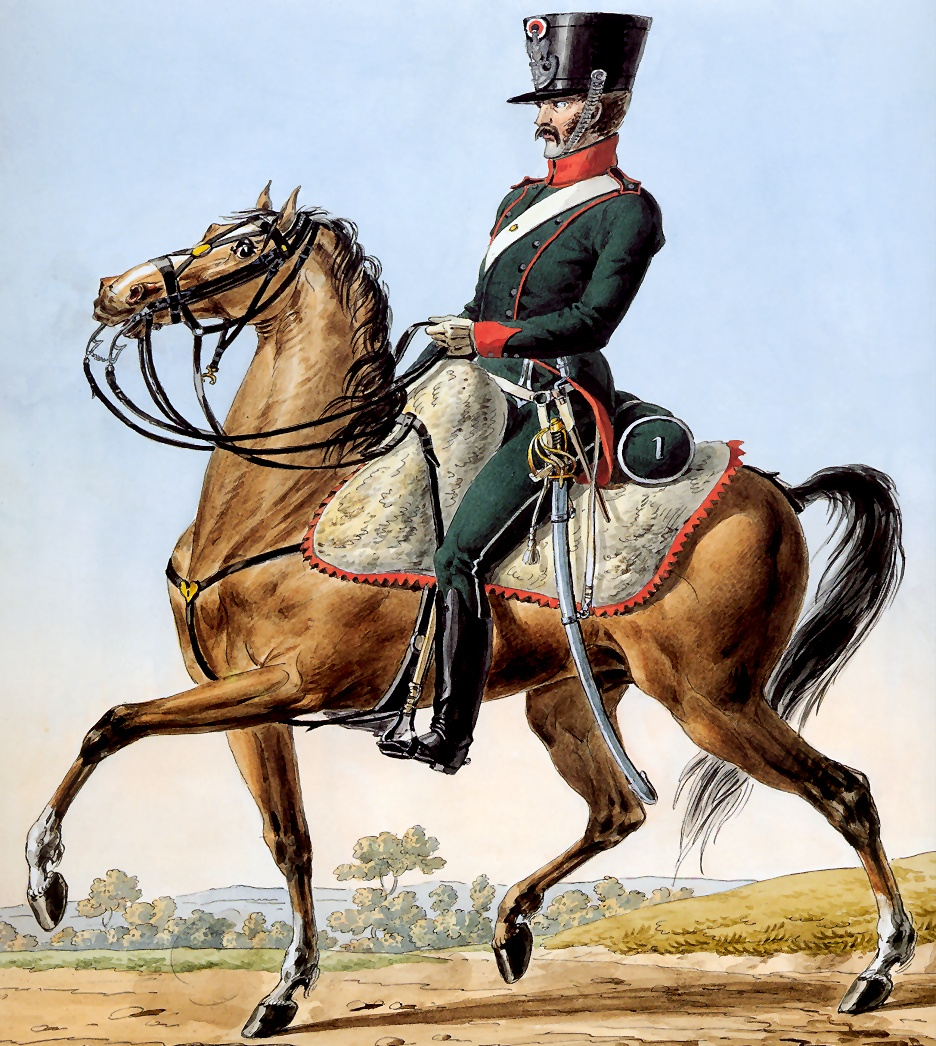
1st Chasseurs à Cheval

At the Battle of Hohenlinden on 3 December, Sahuc was a brigadier in Antoine Richepanse's division. The mounted regiments in the division were the 10th Cavalry, 1st Chasseurs à Cheval, 20th Chasseurs à Cheval, and the 5th Hussars. The division also included one battalion of the 14th Light Infantry and the 8th, 27th, and 48th Line Infantry Demi-Brigades. The 1st Chasseurs led Richepanse's flank attack and engaged in some of the first fighting. Later, Sahuc and his fellow brigadier Jean-Baptiste Drouet were involved in the fighting against Johann Sigismund Riesch's corps. The French scored a decisive victory in the battle.

During the pursuit after Hohenlinden, Richepanse scored successes in a series of actions against the retreating Austrians. At Neumarkt am Wallersee on 16 December, while leading the 48th Line Infantry and the 1st Chasseurs, Sahuc inflicted 500 casualties on the Austrians. At Frankenmarkt on the 17th, the Austrians suffered 2,650 casualties, mostly prisoners. At Schwanenstadt on the 18th, 700 enemy cuirassiers were trapped against a river and taken. That same day at Vöcklabruck, with Sahuc commanding the 48th Line and 14th Light Infantry plus the 1st and 20th Chasseurs, the French captured Austrian general Franz Löpper, two cannons, and many foot soldiers. On the 19th at Lambach, 1,450 troops of the Manfreddini Infantry Regiment No. 12 surrendered and 500 wagons were seized. At Lambach, Sahuc and Jacques Sarrut led the 14th Light and 27th Line Infantry, the 5th Hussars, and the 1st and 20th Chasseurs.

== Empire ==
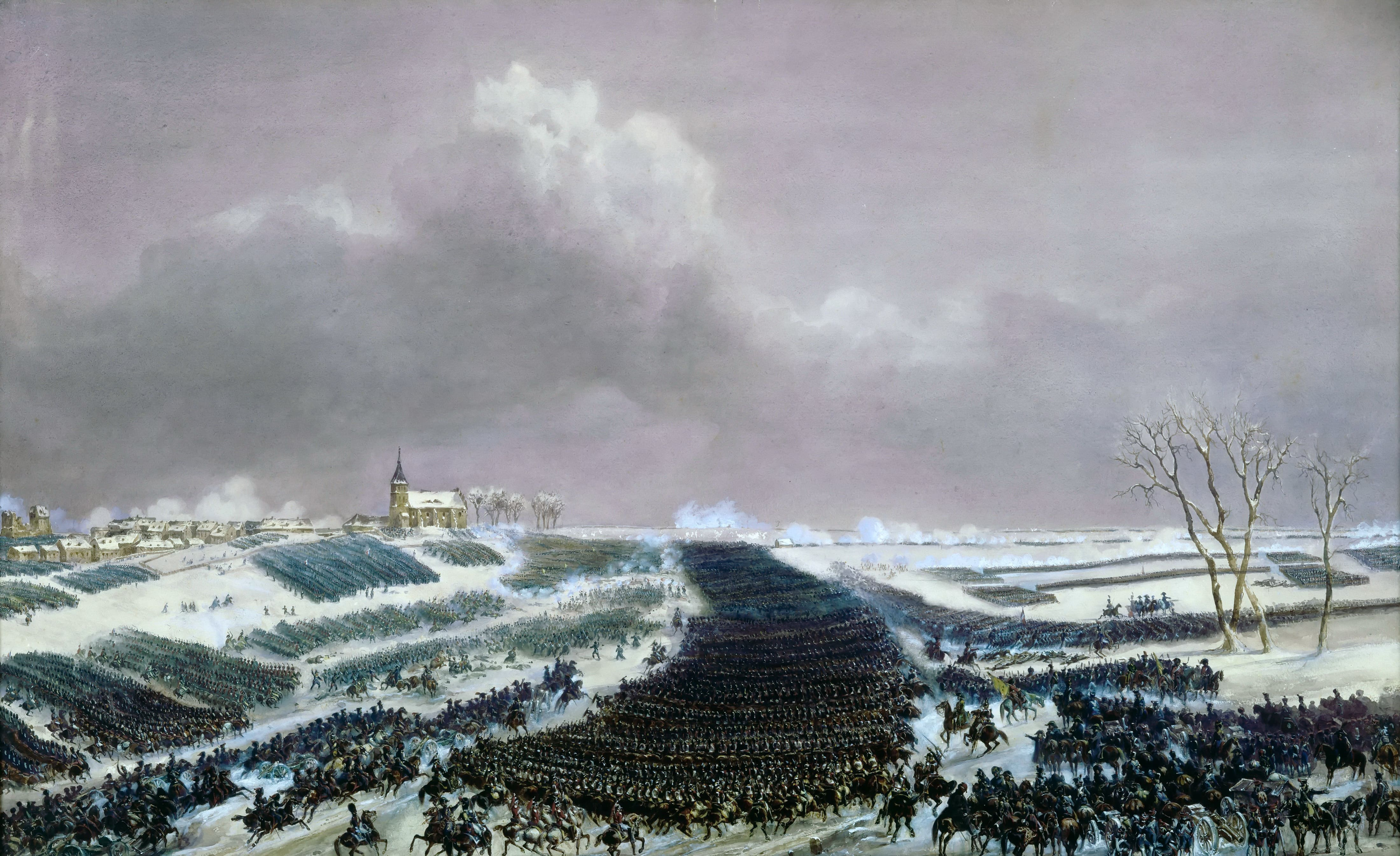
Sahuc fought at the Battle of Eylau. Simeon Fort's painting shows a massed cavalry charge.

Sahuc became a member of the Tribunat in 1801 and was an eager supporter of Napoleon Bonaparte, voting to establish the First French Empire. In 1803 he became a chevalier de l'empire, then in 1804, a commander of the Légion d'Honneur. In the War of the Third Coalition, he served in a division that included the 15th and 17th Dragoon Regiments, which lost their eagles and many troopers at the Battle of Haslach-Jungingen on 11 October 1805. The 18th and 19th Dragoons of the division also fought on 14 October 1805 in the Battle of Elchingen. On 2 December 1805, Sahuc fought at the Battle of Austerlitz in François Antoine Louis Bourcier's 4th Dragoon Division. The 2,500-strong division included the 15th, 17th, 18th, 19th, and 27th Dragoon Regiments and three cannon. The brigadiers were Sahuc and Jean Baptiste Antoine Laplanche.

Napoleon promoted Sahuc to général de division on 4 January 1806. He went on to serve as commander of the 2,600-strong 4th Dragoon Division during the War of the Fourth Coalition. The division included the 17th and 27th Dragoons in the 1st Brigade, the 18th and 19th Dragoons in the 2nd Brigade, and the 15th and 25th Dragoons in the 3rd Brigade. Laplanche led the 2nd Brigade, while the other two brigadiers are not given in the sources. His troopers missed the Battle of Jena-Auerstadt because he marched with Marshal Jean-Baptiste Bernadotte's I Corps. After the battle his division joined Marshal Nicolas Soult's IV Corps for the pursuit. On 1 November his division was at Rathenow moving north to attack Gebhard von Blücher. His division's strength at this time was estimated at 2,550. On 6 November, Sahuc was present with Soult and Marshal Joachim Murat in the Battle of Lübeck where he was at the southeast gate. Once the French seized the gate, the cavalry burst into the streets and helped capture the Owstein Infantry Regiment No. 7. On 25 January, he was present at the Battle of Mohrungen with the 1st and 2nd Brigades. Napoleon appointed him a comte de l'empire in 1808.

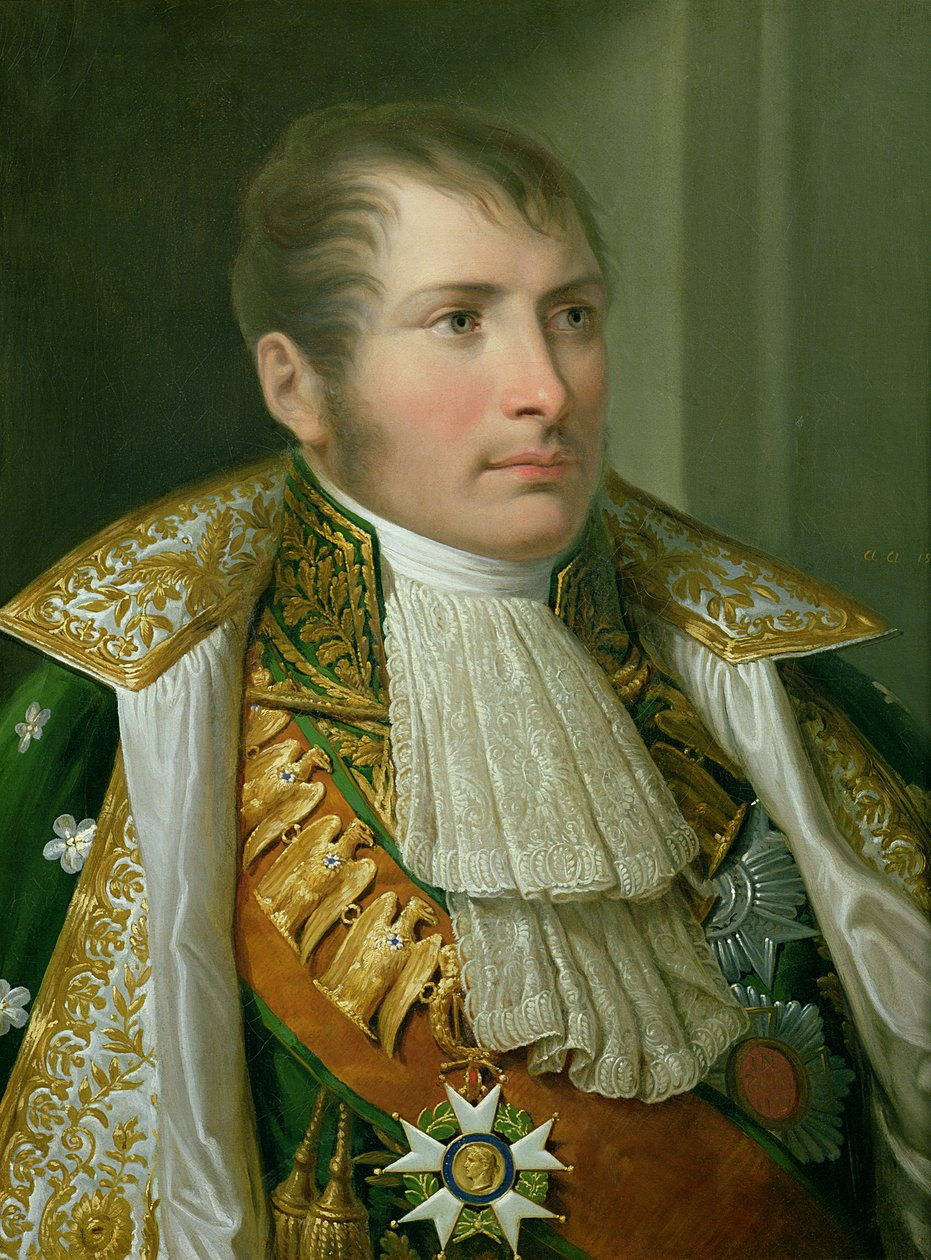
In 1809 Sahuc fought under Eugène de Beauharnais, shown here by Andrea Appiani.

In the War of the Fifth Coalition, Sahuc found himself leading the Light Cavalry Division of the Army of Italy under Eugène de Beauharnais. The division included the 6th Hussars, 6th Chasseurs à Cheval, 8th Chasseurs à Cheval, 25th Chasseurs à Cheval, and a 4-pounder horse artillery battery.

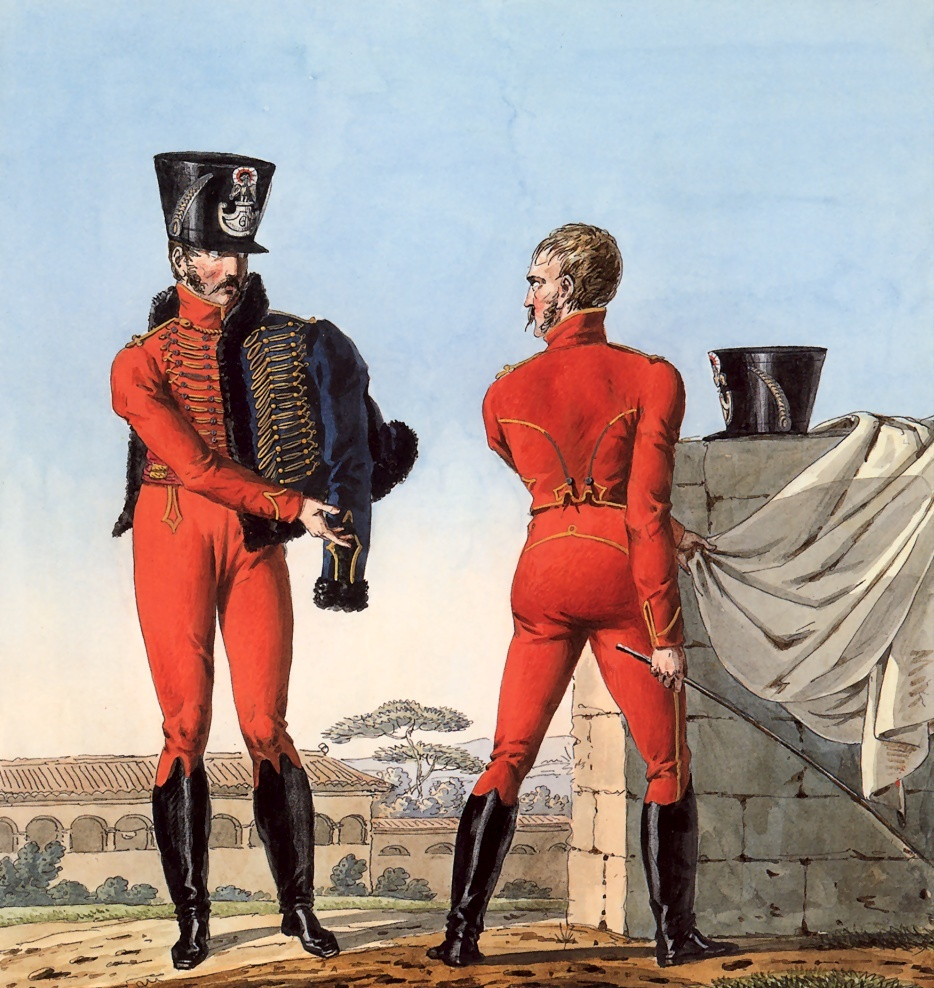
The 6th Hussars were in Sahuc's division in 1809.

In the action at Pordenone, Sahuc was badly beaten. He commanded the 4,800-man army advance guard of two cavalry regiments and the 35th Line Infantry Regiment. At 6:00 AM on 15 April 1809, Johann Maria Philipp Frimont led 5,900 Austrians against the town. Sahuc maneuvered his cavalry north of the town but Frimont attacked his horsemen from the flank, routing them. The 35th, trapped in the town, was nearly destroyed with 500 killed and wounded. In addition, 2,000 men, an eagle, and four cannons were captured. The Austrians only reported 253 casualties. In the Battle of Sacile on 16 April, Eugène refused to fully commit Sahuc's division because of the Austrian cavalry superiority. After Eugène ordered a retreat, Sahuc demonstrated in front of the Austrians, assisting the withdrawal of the divisions of Paul Grenier and Jean-Baptiste Broussier.

At the Battle of Piave River on 8 May, the cavalry divisions of Sahuc and Charles Randon de Pully crossed the Piave to the right while Joseph Marie, Count Dessaix's converged voltiguer (light infantry) division crossed in the center. The two cavalry divisions drove back Johann Kalnássy's brigade into two villages, then rode to Dessaix's rescue. The light infantry formed square and successfully repelled an Austrian cavalry division, but they were being pounded by a massed battery of 24 cannons. The bombardment caused Dessaix's men serious loss and 20 French guns arrived just in time to reply to the Austrian artillery. In the meantime, Sahuc unwisely posted his division in such a way that some of the cannonballs missing the infantry squares hit his troopers. The second time the Austrian cavalry attacked, Sahuc's light horse and Pully's dragoons countercharged and routed them. Following up the Austrian cavalry, the French horsemen overran the battery and captured 14 guns. The Austrian cavalry commander, Christian Wolfskeel von Reichenberg died at the hands of one of Pully's dragoons. After this brilliant success, Sahuc failed to rally his division and a Hungarian countercharge routed the 8th Chasseurs. His other three colonels rose to the occasion and drove off the Hungarians. With his cavalry rendered impotent, Archduke John of Austria could only mount a passive defense, which resulted in his eventual defeat.

When Sahuc participated in the Battle of Raab on 14 June, only the 8th and 25th Chasseurs were present. While Emmanuel Grouchy and Louis-Pierre Montbrun's cavalry on the right flank defeated the Austrians opposed to them, his division guarded the left. As the Austrian army withdrew at the end of the battle, Sahuc's cavalry launched a pursuit which soon came upon some Hungarian insurrection (militia) infantry formed in squares. Though the raw Hungarians fired a scattered volley, they managed to fend off the first charge because the French horsemen attacked in a disorderly fashion. The second charge was better organized. One Chasseur regiment concentrated on one side of a square and broke through. Furious at their earlier repulse, they butchered the helpless Hungarians without mercy, even cutting down those who tried to surrender.

At the Battle of Wagram, Sahuc led a division consisting of the 6th Chasseurs, 8th Chasseurs, and 9th Chasseurs. Before crossing the Danube, he gave a bombastic speech to his horsemen. His cavalry supported the evening attack on 5 July. At first the attack looked promising and Sahuc's chasseurs broke an Austrian battalion. Then the Vincent Chevau-léger Regiment No. 4 caught his horsemen in flank and drove them off. Without cavalry support, the infantry faltered in the face of an Austrian infantry counterattack. The assault ended in failure with the French fleeing back to their starting positions after suffering heavy losses. As dusk came on, Sahuc's troopers countercharged the Austrian cavalry, first firing a volley with their pistols and carbines before wading into them. In the gloom, the white-coated chevau-légers presented obvious targets. Even so, Sahuc lost two of his colonels before the entire French force fell back. On 6 July, his cavalry guarded the flanks of Jacques MacDonald's famous hollow square as it attacked the Austrian center.

From 1809 to 1812 he served in the Corps législatif as a deputy from Oise. Back in uniform, he became the Inspector General of depots and hospitals between the Rhine and the Oder Rivers. At Frankfurt-on-the-Main he became ill from typhus and died on 24 October 1813. SAHUC is engraved on Column 7 of the Arc de Triomphe.
