= Achille Fontanelli =

Italian general and statesman (1775–1838)

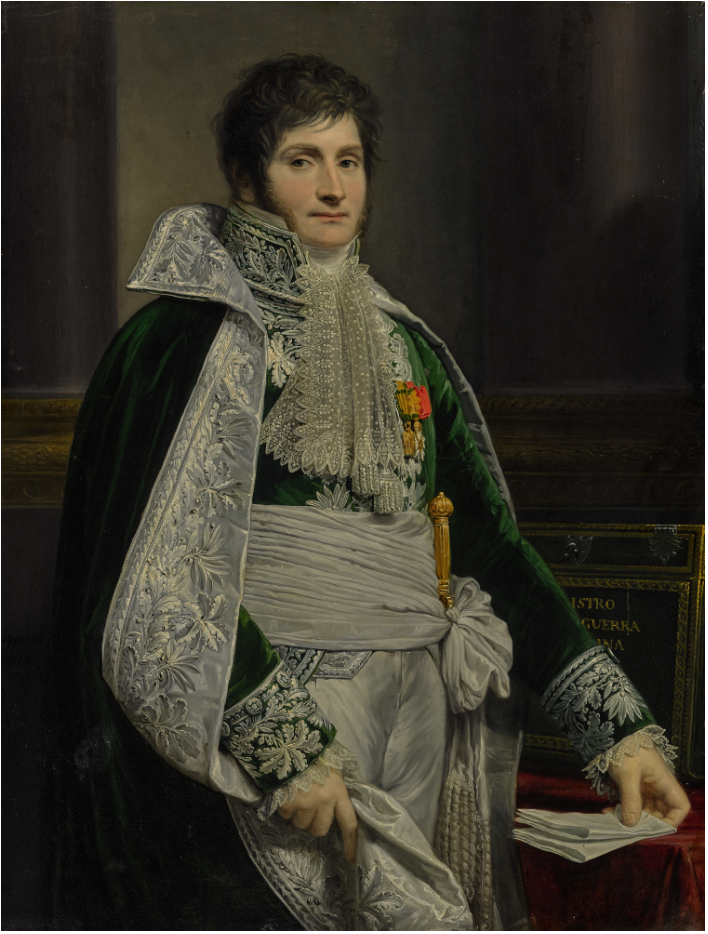
- Portrait by Andrea Appiani
- Born: 18 November 1775; Modena
- Died: 22 July 1838 (aged 62); Milan
- Military career
- Allegiance: Italy; Austrian Empire
- Branch: Infantry
- Service years: 1796–1814 (Italy); 1814–1815 (Austria)
- Rank: General of Division (Italy); Feldmarschall-Leutnant (Austria)
- Conflicts: French Revolutionary Wars; Battle of Faenza; Capture of Corfu; Siege of Ancona; Napoleonic Wars; Battle of Tarvis; Battle of Raab; Battle of Wagram; Battle of Großbeeren; Battle of Dennewitz; Battle of Leipzig; Battle of Hanau
- Awards: Grand Officer of the Legion of Honour; Grand Dignitary of the Order of the Iron Crown

Achille Fontanelli (18 November 1775 – 22 July 1838) was an Italian general and statesman. He served the Cispadane and Cisalpine republics before rising to general of division in the army of the Napoleonic Kingdom of Italy. He was the kingdom's minister of war and navy from 1811 until its collapse in 1814, and subsequently held the Austrian rank of Feldmarschall-Leutnant.

== Biography ==
=== Early life and revolutionary wars ===
Fontanelli was born in Modena on 18 November 1775, the son of Marquis Alfonso Fontanelli and Paolina Cervi. His father, a general and minister of war in the Duchy of Modena and Reggio, died in 1777. Fontanelli was initially educated by the abbot G. Zironi and entered Modena's Collegio San Carlo with two of his brothers in 1787. He showed an aptitude for science and presented a public examination in mechanics in 1792, leaving the college the following year.

When French troops reached Modena in October 1796, Fontanelli accepted a municipal appointment connected with educational property and then chose military service as commander of the first cohort of the Cispadane Legion, with the rank of battalion chief. His unit helped suppress disturbances at Concordia and in the Garfagnana in December 1796. Serving alongside Jean Lannes' brigade during the occupation of Romagna and the Adriatic coast, he fought papal troops at the Senio on 2 February 1797 and captured the fort at Sant'Elpidio five days later.

Fontanelli effectively commanded the Third Legion during the French occupation of the Ionian Islands in 1797 and took part in the capture of Corfu, where he met Eugène de Beauharnais. In 1798 his unit, now incorporated into the Cisalpine army, joined Giuseppe Lechi's brigade and was stationed at Pesaro. There he married Cristina Lorini; their only child died in infancy and Lorini died in 1802.

During the War of the Second Coalition, Fontanelli's Third Cisalpine Demi-Brigade withdrew into Ancona and took part in its defence under General Jean-Charles Monnier. Following the city's capitulation on 13 November 1799, he sailed to France and was assigned to organize a light-infantry battalion of the Italian Legion. In July 1800 he became a sub-inspector of reviews and a brigade chief with the rank of colonel. Austrian forces later captured him in Tuscany and threatened him with a court-martial for violating the terms of the Ancona capitulation, but the intervention of General Guillaume Brune secured his release after the Treaty of Lunéville in February 1801.

Back in Milan, Fontanelli reorganized units of the Cisalpine army and directed the personnel division of the ministry of war. In 1802 he chaired the military commission that tried participants in an uprising at Bologna; its limited sentences and numerous acquittals helped reduce political tensions in the city.

=== Napoleonic Kingdom of Italy ===
Francesco Melzi d'Eril, vice-president of the Italian Republic, appointed Fontanelli his first aide-de-camp and repeatedly proposed him as minister of war. In January 1804 Napoleon instead made Fontanelli his Italian aide-de-camp. After accompanying Napoleon on inspections in northern France, Belgium and the Rhineland, Fontanelli was promoted to general of brigade and admitted to the Legion of Honour late that year.

In 1805 Fontanelli supervised preparations at Milan's royal palace for Napoleon's coronation as king of Italy and commanded the Italian Guard during the ceremony. He subsequently designed a training scheme for officers and non-commissioned officers that led to the formation of two regiments of guards of honour and royal velites. Fontanelli commanded the velites and, from 1807, the Royal Guard.

Promoted to general of division in 1809, Fontanelli initially operated against the Tyrolean insurgency and later temporarily took command of Filippo Severoli's division against the Austrian army of Archduke John. He attacked fortified Austrian positions at Tarvis on 16–17 May, fought at Raab on 14 June and was held in reserve with the guards at Wagram in July. In October he was appointed to the Council of State and received several honours, including the rank of grand officer of the Legion of Honour and grand dignitary of the Order of the Iron Crown. In 1810 he directed the occupation of Lugano, Bellinzona and the Valais without provoking a diplomatic incident.

A decree of 10 August 1811 appointed Fontanelli minister of war and navy. He reorganized the ministry to reduce overlapping responsibilities, centralized business in its general secretariat, codified rules concerning matters including conscription, completed army personnel records, and reformed accounting and archival work. From 1812, however, the demands of Napoleon's wars increasingly shifted his attention to raising men and supplies.

After the French disaster in Russia, Eugène ordered Fontanelli to rebuild and command the division formerly led by Luigi Gaspare Peyri. Attached to the Army of the North in 1813, it fought at Grossbeeren, Dennewitz and Leipzig. During the subsequent retreat Fontanelli commanded the rear guard and defended the position at Hanau. Napoleon then sent him back to Italy to resume control of the ministry and organize new formations. In November 1813 Eugène placed him in charge of the Milanese council of ministers, making him the leading official in the kingdom's government during its final months.

=== Restoration and later life ===
In April 1814 Eugène sent Fontanelli to Paris as the army's representative in a delegation seeking to preserve the independence of the Kingdom of Italy. Political upheaval in Milan ended the project before he could influence the negotiations, and the incoming Austrian administration removed him as minister on 10 May.

Fontanelli was approached by members of a military conspiracy formed in Lombardy later in 1814. Austrian officials considered arresting him but, because the extent of his involvement was uncertain, instead summoned him to Vienna. He denied participating in the conspiracy and received nominal assignments before being incorporated into the Austrian army as a Feldmarschall-Leutnant. This allowed the authorities to monitor him while preserving his public standing.

He soon retired from service and by 1816 was living at his estate at Marzaglia near Modena, where he returned to the study of mathematics and mechanics and managed his land, paying particular attention to hydraulic works. Following the death of his second wife, Lucia Frapolli, in January 1831, the Modenese authorities ordered him to move to Milan so that participants in Ciro Menotti's planned uprising could not use his name. He spent his final years there under police surveillance. Fontanelli developed bone cancer in 1837 and died in Milan on 22 July 1838.

== Honours ==
Fontanelli's honours included:

- Grand Officer of the Legion of Honour
- Commander and later Grand Dignitary of the Order of the Iron Crown
- Count of the French Empire and of the Kingdom of Italy
