= Antonio Fabré y Almerás =

Spanish monk, writer and numismatis

Antonio Fabré y Almerás was an 18th-century Spanish monk, writer and numismatist. He was born in the province of Cádiz in 1728 and died in Rota, Cádiz, in 1806.
