= Gabriel Barbou des Courières =

French general (1761–1827)

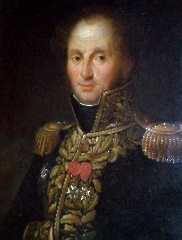
- Born: 23 November 1761; Abbeville, France
- Died: 6 December 1827 (aged 66); Paris, France
- Burial place: Père Lachaise Cemetery
- Military career
- Allegiance: France
- Branch: Infantry
- Service years: 1779-1816
- Rank: General de division
- Conflicts: French Revolutionary Wars; Napoleonic Wars
- Awards: Grand Officer of the Legion of Honour; Knight of Saint Louis

Gabriel Barbou des Courières (11 November 1761 – 9 December 1827) was a French general whose career spanned the Ancien Régime, the French Revolutionary Wars, and the Napoleonic Wars. Born into a military family, he entered the army in 1779 and rose steadily through the ranks, gaining early experience in the West Indies before returning to Europe during the War of the First Coalition. He distinguished himself in several major campaigns on the northern and Rhine fronts, earning rapid promotion to general officer through his conduct at battles and sieges including Fleurus, Aldenhoven, Würzburg, and Neuwied. His combination of administrative ability and battlefield leadership saw him entrusted with brigade and divisional commands, as well as key staff roles, and he played an important part in suppressing internal unrest and resisting the Anglo-Russian invasion of Holland in 1799, actions that secured his promotion to general de division.

During the Napoleonic period, Barbou held a series of senior commands in Germany, Italy, and the Iberian Peninsula, though his later career was more uneven. He fought in the early Peninsular War and was captured after the French defeat at Bailén, and later performed poorly at the battle of Sacile in 1809, after which he was sidelined from major field commands. From 1810 to 1814 he served as governor of Ancona, surrendering the city with honours after a siege during the collapse of Napoleonic rule in Italy. Following the Bourbon Restoration he reconciled with the new regime, but retired from active service in 1816. He died in Paris in 1827; although his grave has been lost, his name is commemorated on the Arc de Triomphe.

== Origins and early career ==
Gabriel Barbou des Courières was born in Abbeville on 11 November 1761, into a prominent upper middle class family from Limousin. His parents were Gabriel Barbou des Courières, a Knight of Saint Louis and captain in the Artois infantry regiment, and Marie Jeanne Bony de la Courcelle.

Barbou enlisted in his father's regiment on 14 May 1779, and was promoted to second lieutenant on 14 January 1782. On 13 December that year he embarked for Jamaica with the 2nd battalion of the regiment, but the beginning Peace of Paris meant that their mission was abandoned and they returned home. He was made a lieutenant on 30 May 1788, and received a second posting to the West Indies, this time to Saint-Domingue, on 28 January 1791. He served there until his return to France in July 1792, at which point the War of the First Coalition was already under way.

== French Revolutionary Wars ==
In July 1793 Barbou went to the front, serving at first in the Army of the North and then as assistant to the adjutant generals of the Army of the Ardennes. His conduct at the siege of Maubeuge won him promotion to the rank of adjudant général chef de bataillon on 31 October 1793. Back in the Army of the North, he fought at Le Cateau, was further promoted to adjudant général chef de brigade and then served at the battle of Fleurus. As chief of staff to general Schérer, he took part in the sieges of Landrecies, Le Quesnoy, Valenciennes and Condé.

On 7 September 1794, Barbou was provisionally promoted to the rank of general de brigade. He fought at the battles of Sprimont and Aldenhoven before taking command of a brigade in Bernadotte's division of the Army of the Sambre and Meuse for the campaigns of 1795 and 1796. His promotion was confirmed by the Committee of Public Safety on 13 June 1795. He took part in the attack on Weißenthurm, the blockade of Cassel, the capture of Kreuznach and Kirchberg, and various crossings of the Rhine. On 22 August 1796, he defended the position at Theiningen for twenty-two hours against superior numbers. He also distinguished himself days later in the battle of Neuss and later in the battle of Würzburg. When Bernadotte left to join the Army of Italy, Barbou remained in Germany and transferred to the division of General Paul Grenier on 13 February 1797. He served at the battle of Neuwied on 18 April and led the corps before Kastel on 20 May.

After the treaty of Campo Formio ended fighting on the Rhine, Barbou returned to the Army of the North where he became chief of staff. He took part in suppressing the Peasants' War in Brabant where "his firmness and moderation restored order in the country and earned him widespread respect." On 23 September 1798 he was assigned to the Army of Batavia, taking part the following year in opposing the Anglo-Russian invasion of Holland in command of a brigade in General Daendels' division. He fought at Krabbendam, Bergen (where his brigade captured seven standards and six guns) and Castricum, his conduct earning him promotion to General de Division on 19 October 1799.

The following year Barbou led a division in Augereau's Franco-Batavian Army as it advanced into Franconia in support of Moreau's Army of the Rhine. He fought at Burg Eberach on 3 December and in front of Nuremberg 18–21 December 1800. Once the fighting ended with the Peace of Lunéville, he led the army back to The Hague.

In the few years of peace that followed, Barbou had a series of administrative posts. He was appointed commander of the 27th Military Division in Turin on 3 March 1802, replaced Ney as commander in Switzerland on 31 October the same year. On 27 October 1803 he took command of a division in the Utrecht camp, before transferring to the Army of Hanover the following year. He was made a knight of the Legion of Honour on 11 December 1803, and a commander on 14 June 1804.

== Napoleonic Wars ==
At the outbreak of the War of the Third Coalition, Barbou was commanding a division in the Army of Hanover under Marshal Bernadotte. When Bernadotte left to take command of I Corps in the Grande Armée, Barbou took over command in Hanover. Facing superior Russian and Swedish forces, he was forced to retreat to the fortress of Hamelin, where he remained until the Peace of Pressburg.

Ill health meant Barbou could not take up a post in Dalmatia in 1806, instead he became commander of the 11th military division in Bordeaux. On 3 November 1807 he was given command of the first division in General Dupont's 2nd Gironde Observation Corps. As part of this corps, he took part in one of the early campaigns of the Peninsular War, marching into Andalusia under Dupont's command. He took part in the battle of Alcolea Bridge and the capture of Córdoba, before leading his division in the disastrous battle of Bailén. Like the rest of Dupont's army, he was taken prisoner by the Spanish, but was repatriated to Toulon two months later.

Unlike some of the generals at Bailén, Barbou suffered no immediate repercussions from the affair and was soon given a new post. On 15 October 1808 he took command of the 5th Division of the Army of Italy under Eugène de Beauharnais. When Archduke John's Austrians invaded on the outbreak of the War of the Fifth Coalition the following year, Barbou fought at the battle of Sacile but did badly, handling his division with "indolence and ill will." Unhappy with his performance at Sacile, Eugene assigned the "fractious and unwelcome" Barbou to the garrison of Venice following the battle. Later, once the Austrians had been driven back, Barbou was sent to put down uprisings in the Tyrol.

In 1810, Barbou was appointed governor of Ancona, a post he would occupy for the next four years. When King of King of Naples Joachim Murat switched sides, Barbou was besieged in the citadel there by Neapolitan troops on 13 January 1814. The siege was conducted in a civil manner more typical of the eighteenth century to spare the civilian population, and Barbou capitulated with the honours of war on 18 February. He was not employed again before the collapse of the Napoleonic regime.

Barbou returned to France in May 1814 and made his peace with the Bourbons. He was made a Knight of Saint Louis and a Grand Officer of the Legion of Honour in the two months that followed. He took no part in the Hundred Days, and afterwards was given command of the 13th Military District in Rennes. His last official act was to issue a proclamation to the populace urging them to welcome the Prussians. He retired from service on 8 February 1816.

== Family ==
Barbou married Rose Marie Sophie Josèphe Henrique (1785–1843) on 15 July 1806. The couple had four children:

- Zénaïde Gabrielle Barbou des Courières (1807–1868)
- Eugénie Gabrielle Barbou des Courières (1811–1885), who married baron Jean-Charles Rivet
- Gabriel Barbou des Courières (1812–1814)
- Joséphine Aimable Barbou des Courières (1816–1817)

Barbou died on 6 December 1827 (aged 66) in Paris, and was buried in Père Lachaise Cemetery, though the exact location of his grave has since been lost. His name is inscribed on the north side of the Arc de Triomphe.
