= Albert Gyulay =

Albert Gyulay de Marosnémethi et Nádaska
- Born: 12 September 1766; Ofen, Hungary
- Died: 27 April 1835 (aged 68); Pest, Hungary
- Military career
- Allegiance: Austrian Empire
- Rank: Feldmarschall-Leutnant
- Conflicts: Austro-Turkish War (1788–1791); Siege of Belgrade; French Revolutionary Wars; Battle of Tournay; Battle of Verona; Battle of Magnano; Napoleonic Wars; Battle of Sacile; Battle of Piave River; Battle of Tarvis
- Awards: Military Order of Maria Theresa, KC 1789
- Other work: Inhaber Infantry Regiment Nr. 21; Privy Councillor, 1830

Count Albert Gyulay de Marosnémethi et Nádaska or Albert Gyulai von Máros-Németh und Nádaska (12 September 1766 – 27 April 1835) a Hungarian, joined the army of Habsburg Austria and fought against Ottoman Turkey. He served against the French First Republic in the Flanders Campaign and on the Rhine. Severely wounded in 1799, he survived a trepanning operation and briefly retired from military service. He returned to active service and commanded an army corps during the War of the Fifth Coalition, part of the Napoleonic Wars. He led his troops in several important battles during the Austrian invasion of Italy in 1809, including one where he was in independent command. Though appointed to command troops in 1813 and 1815, he missed combat in both campaigns. He was Proprietor (Inhaber) of an Austrian infantry regiment from 1810 until his death. The more famous Ignác Gyulay, Ban of Croatia was his older brother.

== Early career ==
Born into a noble Hungarian family on 12 September 1766, Albert Gyulay became a junior Leutnant in the Kaiser Hussar Regiment Nr. 1 on 1 May 1784. Previous to his appointment, he received military training as a cadet at the Theresienstatt Academy. His father, Sámuel Gyulay was a general officer and Inhaber of Infantry Regiment Nr. 32 from 1773 until his death in 1802. His mother was Anna Bornemisza de Kászon. In October 1787 he briefly transferred into the Alvinczi Infantry Regiment Nr. 19 before entering the Szekler Hussar Regiment Nr. 44 in December. The Austro-Turkish War broke out that year and he fought in Transylvania in 1788. On 26 August 1788 he won distinction in a skirmish at the Törzburger Pass at the head of a hussar squadron. Gyulay transferred into his father's regiment as a Hauptmann (captain) of grenadiers in February 1789 and fought at the Siege of Belgrade in autumn that year. He led his company in the Kempf Grenadier Battalion in Franz von Werneck's column during the successful assault on the city, which capitulated on 8 October. He was awarded the Knight's Cross of the Military Order of Maria Theresa on 21 December 1789.

== French Revolution ==
In 1793 during the War of the First Coalition, Gyulay fought in several actions and was promoted to major in the O'Donell Freikorps on 1 May. The following year found him serving in Heinrich, Count of Bellegarde's brigade in a number of minor actions. He defeated the French troops opposed to him in the Battle of Tournay on 22 May 1794. That year he married Justine Wynants (d. 1824). On 19 April 1797, he fought in a successful action in the aftermath of Werneck's defeat at the Battle of Neuwied on the Rhine. The same month he received promotion to Oberstleutnant in his father's regiment.

Gyulay became Oberst of the newly formed Infantry Regiment Nr. 48 on 26 April 1798. In the War of the Second Coalition, his troops drove off French attacks in the Battle of Verona on 26 April 1799. At the Battle of Magnano on 6 April, his regiment formed part of Ferdinand Minckwitz's brigade in Konrad Valentin von Kaim's division. While leading an attacking column against Antoine Guillaume Delmas' French division, he was struck in the head by a musket ball. The bullet was removed by trepanning at Verona, but the dangerous injury forced Gyulay to retire from the army the next year. He was appointed Generalmajor on 24 July 1800. He was succeeded as Oberst of Regiment Nr. 48 by Josef Philipp Vukassovich.

== 1809 campaign ==
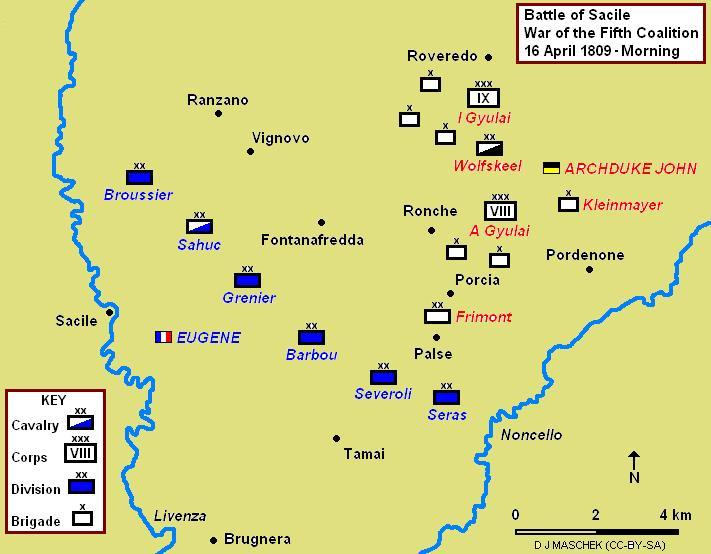
Battle of Sacile, 16 April 1809, showing morning positions

Gyulay returned to active service in 1803 and was elevated in rank to Feldmarschall-Leutnant on 14 August 1808. The outbreak of the War of the Fifth Coalition found him in command of a division in the VIII Armeekorps of Johann Gabriel Chasteler de Courcelles. When the Tyrolean Rebellion erupted in April 1809, Archduke John of Austria sent Chasteler into the Tyrol with about 10,000 troops and appointed Gyulay commander of the VIII Armeekorps. By coincidence, his older brother Ignác Gyulay led the IX Armeekorps, which was the other major maneuver unit in John's army.

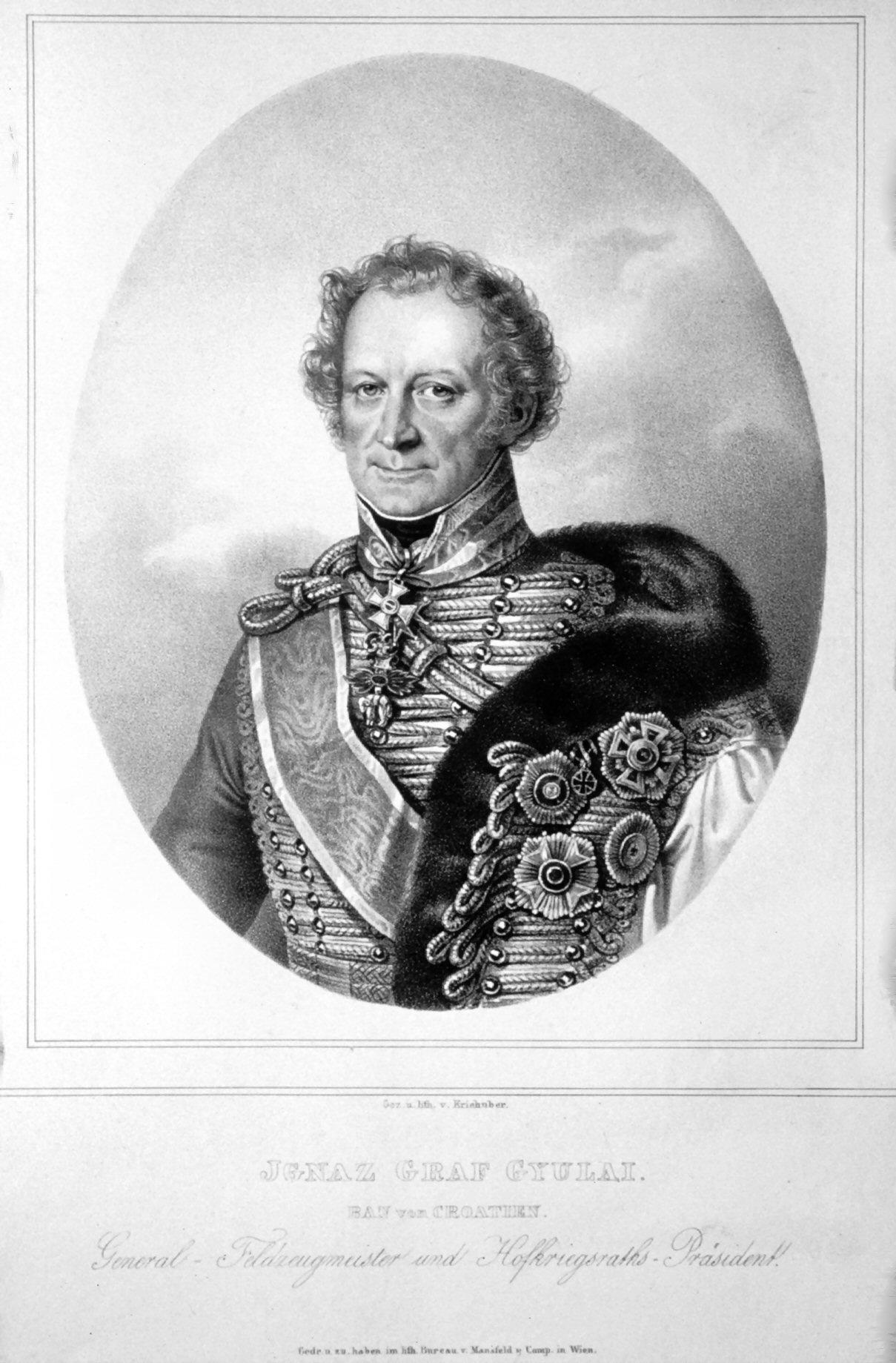
Ignác Gyulay, Ban of Croatia, was Albert's older brother.

On 10 April, Albert Gyulay's VIII Armeekorps advanced from Tarvisio (Tarvis) and two days later it occupied Udine. Near the latter city, he was joined by his brother's corps which had marched from Ljubljana (Laibach). French reconnaissance was poor and the opposing army commander, Eugène de Beauharnais remained unaware that the VIII and IX Armeekorps had joined forces. Meanwhile, Archduke John formed a third maneuver unit, an army Advance Guard and placed it under the command of Johann Maria Philipp Frimont. The Advance Guard was created from Frimont's 2nd Division of the VIII Armeekorps. John ordered a night march on the evening of 14 April, Frimont's Advance Guard leading, followed by the VIII Armeekorps, while the IX brought up the rear. Frimont caught Eugène's own advance guard at Pordenone on the morning of 15 April and defeated it. The French lost 500 killed and wounded, plus 2,000 prisoners, while Austrian losses were only 253.

Expecting the imminent arrival of two divisions, an overconfident Eugène engaged John's army on 16 April in the Battle of Sacile. Eugène planned a two-division attack on the village of Porcia where Frimont and Albert Gyulay posted their troops. Delayed by the rainy weather, Ignác Gyulay's corps camped behind the VIII Armeekorps. John anticipated Eugène's attack and planned to have Albert Gyulay and Frimont absorb the blow, while swinging Ignác Gyulay against his enemies' left flank. The morning attack pressed hard against Frimont's troops in Porcia, so Albert Gyulai launched a counterattack which badly shook the Franco-Italians. Eugène committed a third division to the combat and it captured Porcia. Even so, Albert Gyulai and his troops resisted so fiercely that Eugène sent in a fourth division, leaving himself with only one remaining infantry division, plus cavalry. Delayed by rain, his reinforcements never made it to the battlefield. At this moment, Ignác Gyulai's corps advanced upon the badly weakened Franco-Italian left flank.

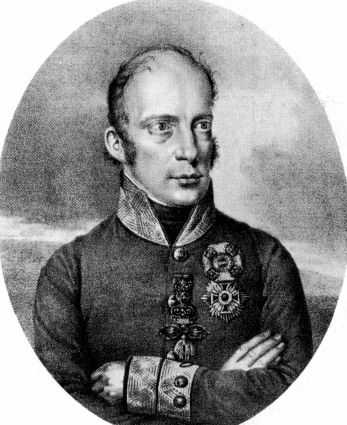
Archduke John

When Eugène recalled his fourth division to save his left flank, Albert Gyulay's troops recaptured Porcia. After an all-day fight, at 5:00 PM the French commander accepted defeat and ordered a withdrawal. Ignác Gyulay pursued the two divisions and cavalry of Eugène's left flank, while Albert Gyulay and Frimont pushed back the three divisions of the right. The VIII Armeekorps suffered the brunt of the Austrian losses, which were 2,617 killed and wounded, 532 captured and 697 missing, for a total of 3,846. The Franco-Italians lost 3,000 killed and wounded, while 19 guns and 3,500 prisoners fell into Austrian hands.

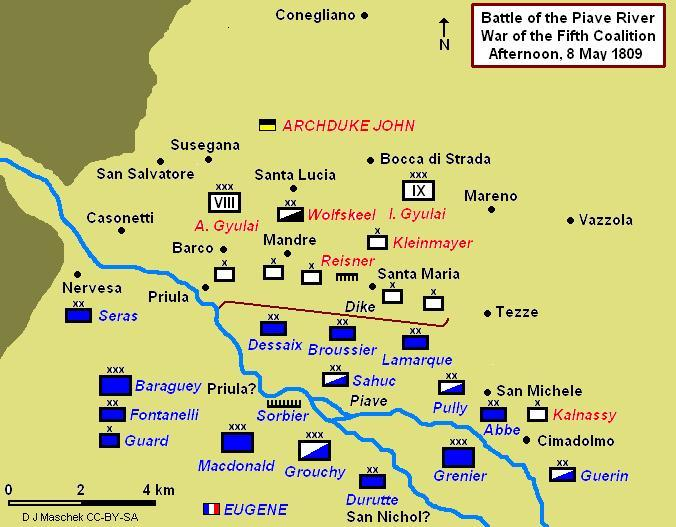
Battle of Piave River, 8 May 1809, showing afternoon positions

By the end of April, Eugène withdrew to Verona, gathered reinforcements, and reorganized his army. Archduke John took a position with his left flank behind the Adige River at Legnago and his right flank under Albert Gyulay behind the Alpone River at Soave, near the Arcole battlefield of 1796. On 29 April, Paul Grenier thrust at Soave, but Albert Gyulay repulsed his attack. However, an Italian attack in the hills to the north seized Castelcerino village and threatened to turn the Austrian flank. The French suffered an estimated 1,000 casualties against 400 Austrians killed and wounded, plus 300 more captured. Albert Gyulay counterattacked the next day with 6,000 infantry and recovered Castelcerino from its 5,000 Italian defenders. Austrian losses numbered 300 killed and wounded and 572 missing, while the French admitted 409 casualties. On 1 May, John withdrew to the east, pausing behind the Brenta River before crossing the Piave River and camping near Conegliano.

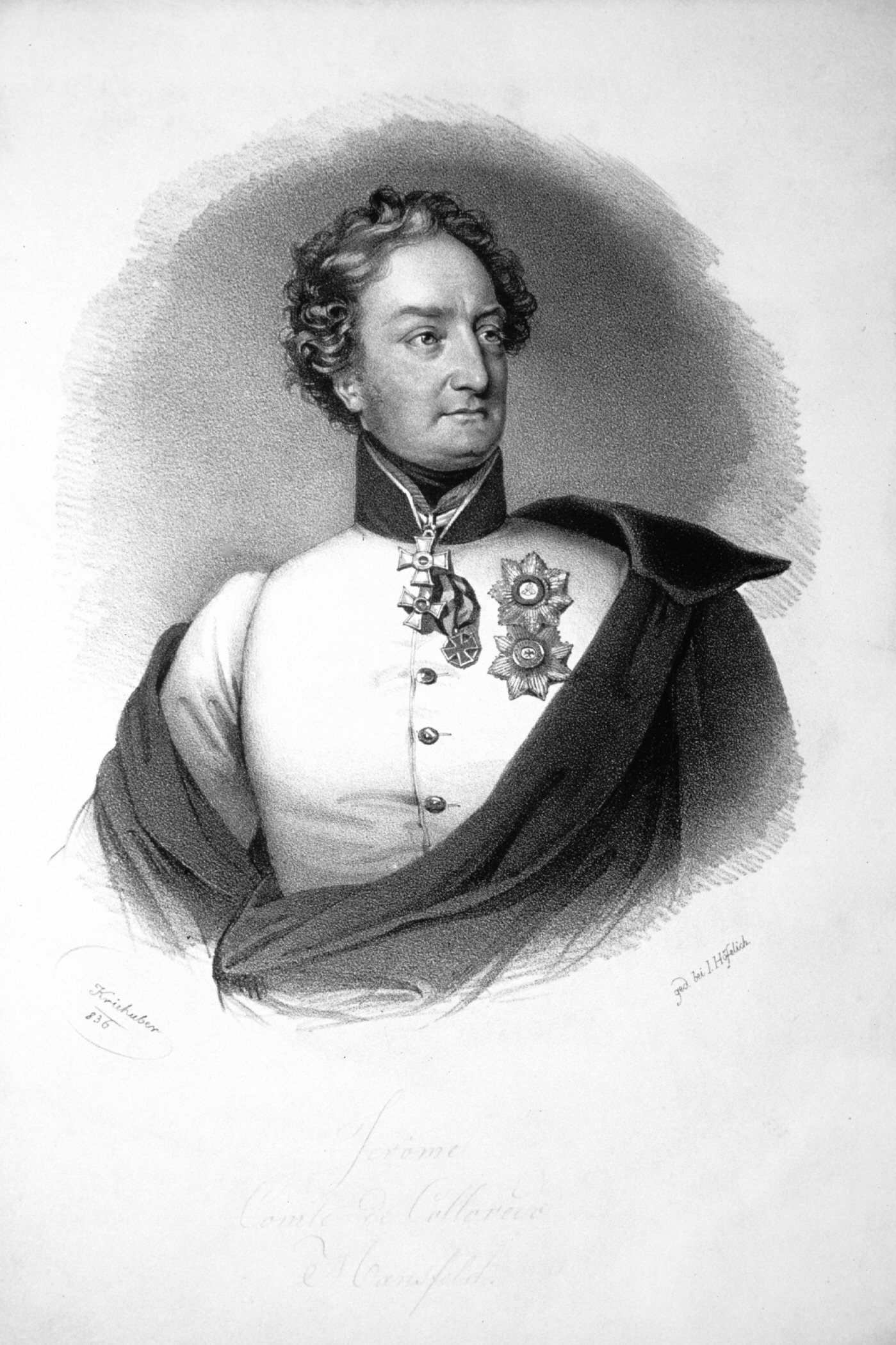
Hieronymus Colloredo

It became evident that Eugène was bent on a close pursuit, so John ordered his army to take up positions to defend the Piave. When Joseph Marie, Count Dessaix's light infantry division crossed the river early on 8 May to bring on the Battle of Piave River, John's troops were drawn up much closer to the river than Eugène suspected, with VIII Armeekorps on the right flank and Ignác Gyulay's IX Armeekorps on the left. (Note: None of the sources mention where Frimont's Advance Guard deployed, though his horsemen joined the ad hoc cavalry division of Wolfskehl.) At this time, Albert Gyulay's corps consisted only of the brigades of Hieronymus Karl Graf von Colloredo-Mansfeld and Anton Gajoli. Dessaix was met with a massed cavalry charge led by Christian Wolfskehl von Reichenberg, which he repelled by forming his voltiguers in square. But the French soon came under fire from a 24-gun battery.

Eugène reinforced Dessaix's 5,000 troops and four cannons with two cavalry divisions and 20 additional guns. With the two grand batteries pounding away at each other, the French horsemen launched a charge that enveloped the ends of the Austrian gun line and crashed into the opposing cavalry. A French dragoon slew Wolfskehl, his second-in-command became a prisoner, and the Austrian cavalry was put to rout. The artillery crews managed to save ten guns, but the rest became prizes of the French.

The victorious French troopers chased the fugitives until they encountered the troops of Colloredo and Gajoli, deployed behind the Piavisella canal. Unable to make headway, the French cavalry withdrew. There was a lull in the battle as Eugène got as much infantry as possible to ford the river before the rising waters drowned the fords. John was unable to take advantage of the situation because his cavalry was beaten and demoralized. Late in the afternoon, the French commander launched his final attack, sending Grenier's corps against the Austrian left and Jacques MacDonald's corps against Albert Gyulay's Piavisella line. When Grenier dislodged his left flank brigade, John ordered a general retreat back to Conegliano. The French lost about 2,000 casualties, while the Austrian losses numbered 398 killed, 697 wounded, 1,681 captured, and 1,120 missing, for a total of 3,896 men and 15 guns lost.

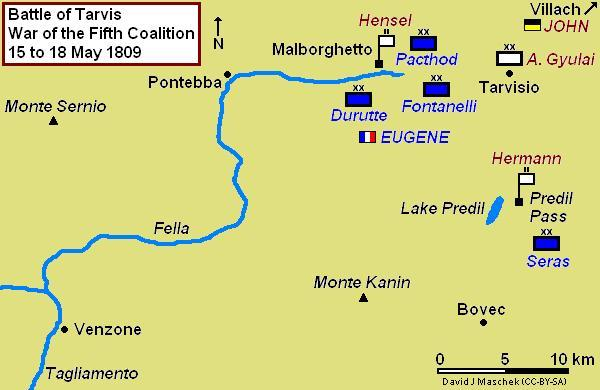
Battle of Tarvis showing the Malborghetto and Predil Forts

As John retreated, he split up his army, sending the rump of the IX Armeekorps east to defend Carniola (modern Slovenia) under Ignác Gyulay. As Ban of Croatia, Ignác had the authority to muster the Croatian insurrectio or militia. With the remainder of his army, John marched northeast toward the Austrian base at Villach and recalled Chasteler from the Tyrol to help defend the frontier. After smashing Frimont's rear guard at San Daniele del Friuli on 11 May, Eugène pursued John northeast. Despite his setback, Frimont clashed with his enemies at Venzone and successfully burned the bridges behind him.

Archduke John reorganized his Italian army into three major bodies in mid-May. Ignác Gyulay assembled 14,880 soldiers and 26 guns into four brigades at Kranj (Krain). Albert Gyulay defended Tarvisio with 8,340 troops and 20 guns in the brigades of Gajoli, Franz Marziani, and Peter Lutz. Frimont's Mobile Corps lay at Villach with 13,060 men and 22 guns in four brigades. In addition, John controlled Franz Jellacic's 10,200-strong Northern Division and Andreas Stoichevich's 8,100-man force in Dalmatia.

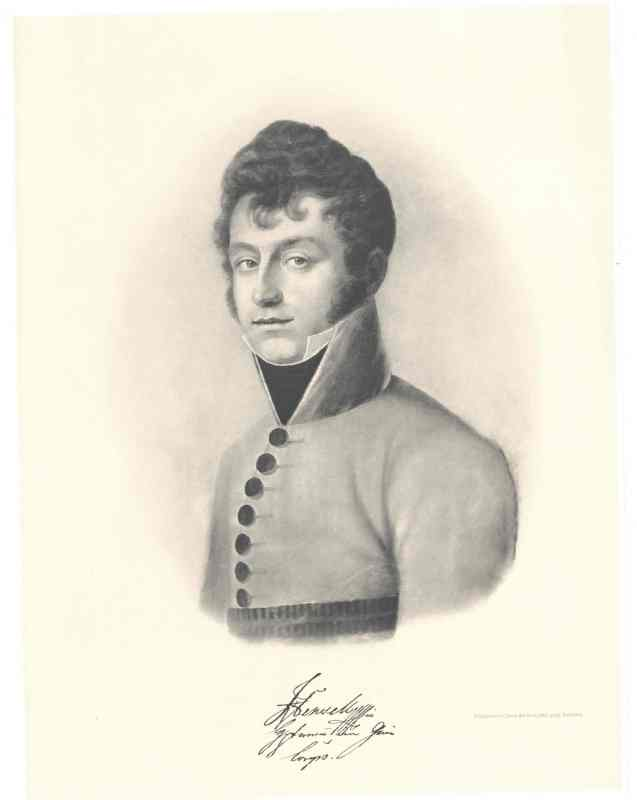
Friedrich Hensel

In trying to break through the Alpine barrier, Eugène sent MacDonald east with 14,000 troops in three divisions, Jean-Baptiste Dominique Rusca's division north into the upper Piave valley, and Jean Mathieu Seras' division north up the Soča (Isonzo) River. He took 25,000 troops in the corps of Grenier and Louis Baraguey d'Hilliers in John's wake along the Fella River valley. With so many bridges down, the French commander was compelled to send his cavalry, most of his artillery, and his wagon train on Seras' route.

Holding Tarvisio with only 6,000 troops, Albert Gyulay relied on two outlying forts to stall the Franco-Italian advance. At Malborghetto Valbruna, a fort frowned down upon the Fella valley from a mountain spur. The Predil Pass blockhouse stood athwart Seras' road from the south. Malborghetto was defended by Captain Friedrich Hensel with 650 Grenz infantry and 10 cannons, while Captain Johann Hermann, 250 Grenzers, and eight artillery pieces held Predil. Eugène and Seras arrived before the two forts on 15 May and initiated the Battle of Tarvis. Baraguey d'Hilliers bypassed Malborghetto with two divisions and skirmished with Albert Gyulay's main force at Tarvisio on 16 May, while Grenier moved his two divisions into assault positions below the Malborghetto fort. Beginning at 9:30 AM on 17 May, 15,000 troops stormed the position in thirty minutes. Hensel and 350 Austrians were killed and between 50 and 300 were captured. Grenier reported 80 casualties but losses were probably much heavier. Between 50 and 300 Austrians were captured.

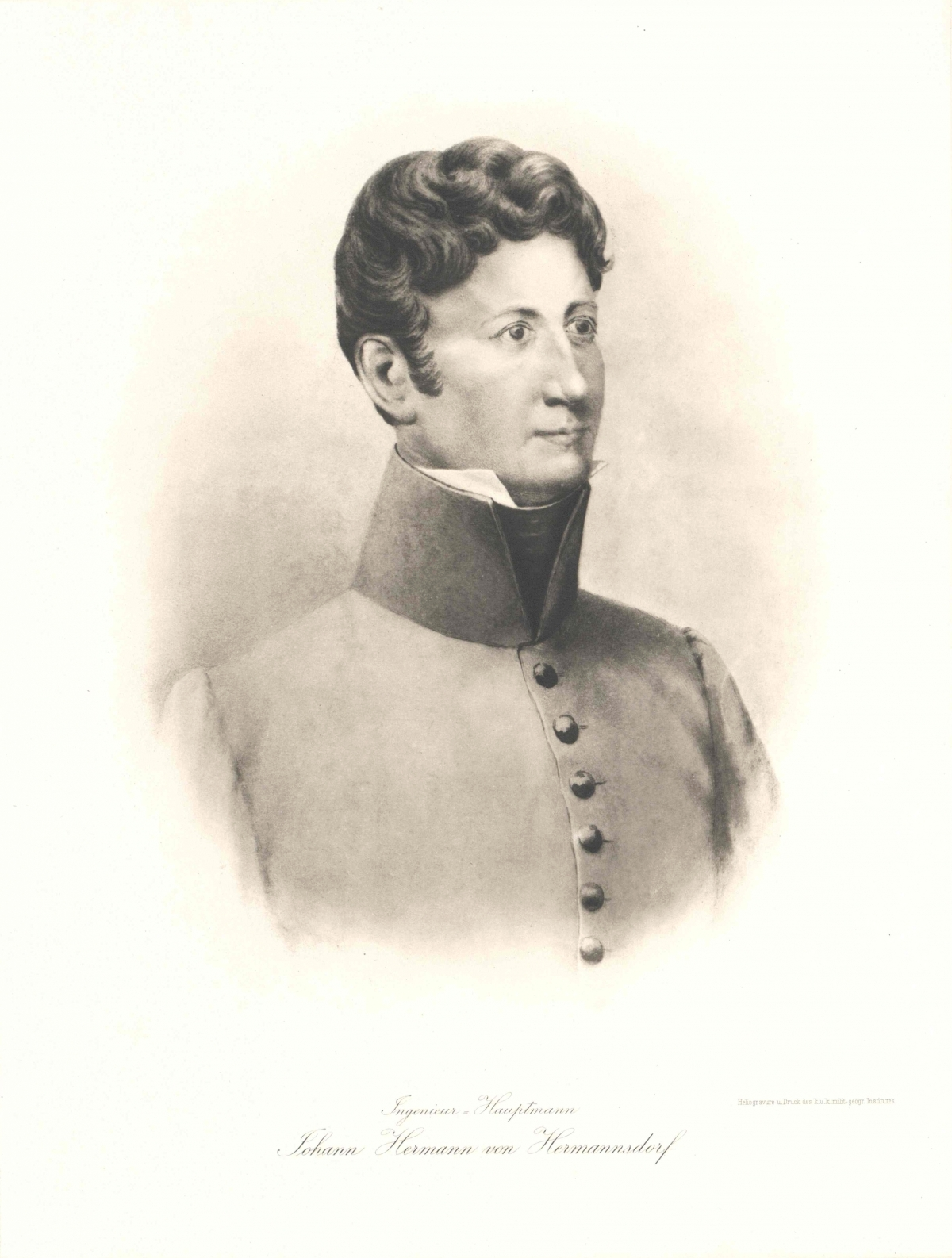
Johann Hermann

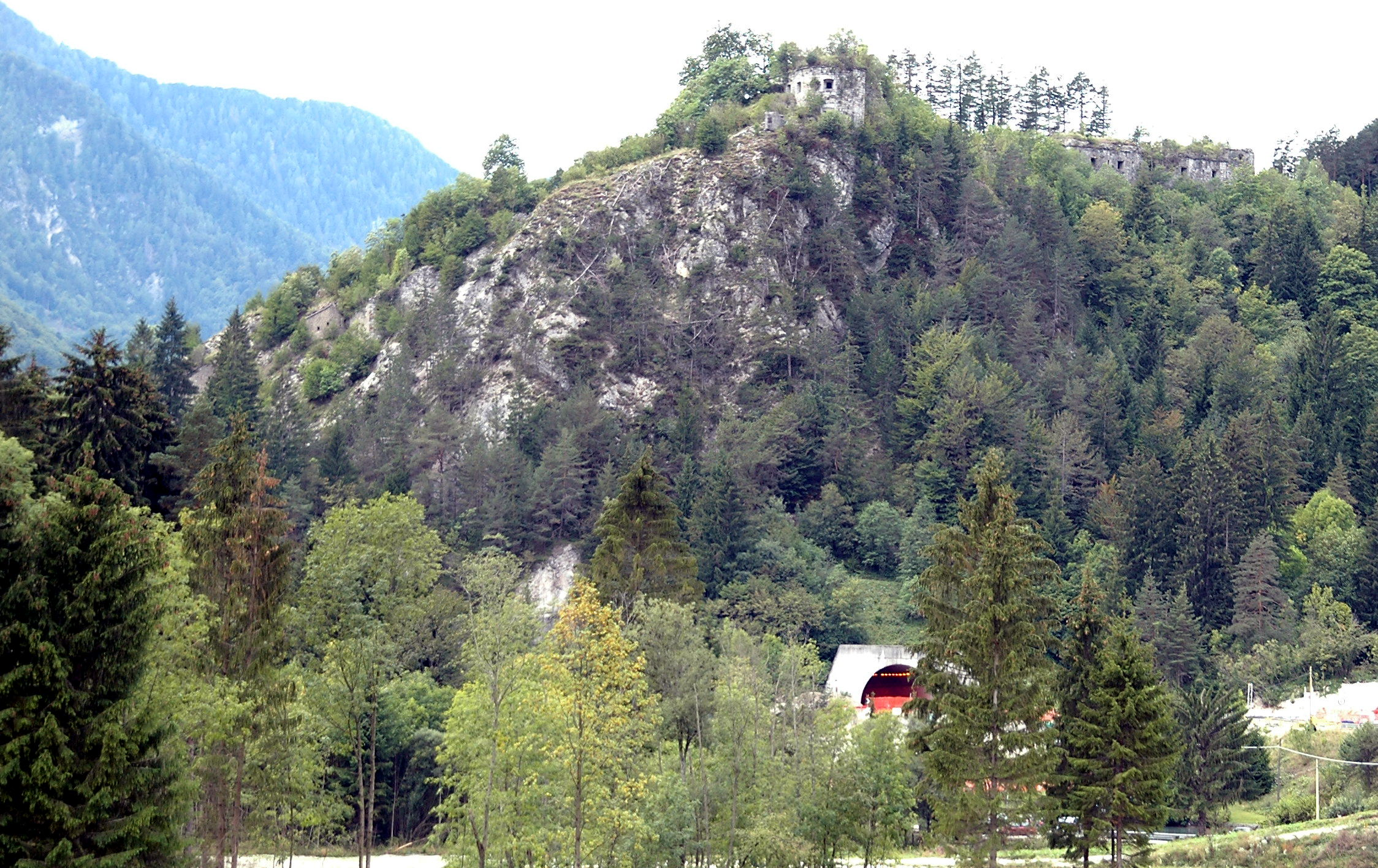
The Malborghetto fort looms over the Fella valley. This view looks west.

Meanwhile, Albert Gyulay abandoned Tarvisio and pulled back behind a stream on the east side of the town. The position was buttressed with a line of fortified redoubts. But the batteries were armed with only 10 of the 24 cannons that were planned. He deployed elements of the brigades of Gajoli, Marziani, and Lutz, plus the Strassoldo Infantry Regiment Nr. 27. After securing Malborghetto, Grenier rapidly moved his two divisions to join those of Baraguey d'Hilliers at Tarvisio in a noon attack. An Italian division overran a key redoubt on Gyulay's left and began to flank the Austrian infantry out of position. As the line began to crack, Grenier's troops advanced, forcing Gyulay to order a retreat. Under pressure of superior numbers, the Austrian troops panicked and fled, losing as many as 3,000 killed, wounded, and captured. Gyulay reported losing 217 men killed, 271 wounded, 1,301 captured, and 170 missing, a total of 1,959 and six guns.

To the south, Seras was unable to make an impression on the Predil blockhouse with his artillery. Needing to use the Predil Pass to bring up his cavalry, artillery, and trains, Eugène sent three battalions from Tarvisio to help. On the 18th, Seras attacked the Grenzers with 8,500 troops and 12 guns. After a heroic last stand, Hermann and his garrison were killed to a man. The Franco-Italians lost 450 killed and wounded. After the defeat, Gyulay was unable to follow John's retreat to Graz. Instead, he followed the Drava River east and joined the archduke at Szentgotthárd in Hungary on 2 June. Gyulay missed the Battle of Raab on 14 June.

== Later career ==
Emperor Francis I of Austria appointed him Inhaber of the Albert Gyulay Infantry Regiment Nr. 21 on 7 February 1810, a position he held for the remainder of his life. He was preceded as Inhaber by Sigmund von Gemmingen-Hornberg (d. 1807) and succeeded by Johann Paumgartten. Gyulay was named to command the Reserve Armeekorps on the Danube in 1813 and a division in the Hundred Days campaign of 1815. Neither appointment resulted in combat. He died on 27 April 1835 in Pest. Albert and Justine had four children, Sámuel Belá Crescencius (1803–1886), Albert (b. 1805), Lajos (d. 1845), and Anna Jozefa (d. 1837).

== Notes ==
Footnotes

Citations

Military offices
Preceded by none (new regiment)	Oberst of Infantry Regiment Nr. 48; 1798–1799	Succeeded by Josef Philipp Vukassovich
Preceded by Louis Victor Meriadec de Rohan-Guéméné	Proprietor (Inhaber) of Infantry Regiment Nr. 21; 1810–1835	Succeeded by Johann Paumgartten
