= Louis Alméras =

French general

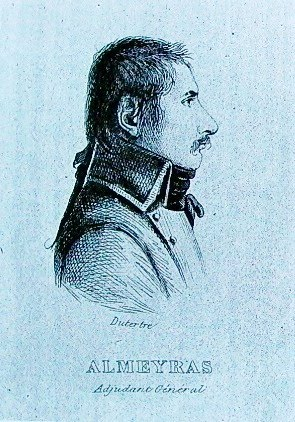
Louis Alméras (1798)

Louis, baron Alméras (15 March 1768 in Vienne, Isère – 7 January 1828 in Bordeaux) was a French general. He distinguished himself under Napoleon in Italy and Egypt, and was taken prisoner by the Russians in the retreat from Moscow. Returning to France after Napoleon's fall, he was made chevalier of St. Louis in 1814. In 1823, governor of Bordeaux, where, prematurely old through hard service and wound, he died. He was a commander of the Order of Saint Louis.
