= Filippo Severoli =

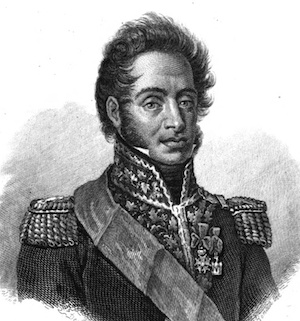
- Philippe Eustache Louis Severoli
- Born: 16 November 1762; Faenza
- Died: 6 October 1822 (aged 59); Fusignano (aged 59)
- Military career
- Allegiance: Kingdom of Italy (1798–1815); Austrian Empire (1815–1822)
- Rank: Division general (Italy); Lieutenant general (Austria)
- Conflicts: War of the Second Coalition; Napoleonic Wars; War of the Fourth Coalition; War of the Fifth Coalition; Battle of Raab; Peninsular War

Filippo Severoli (Faenza, 16 November 1762 — Fusignano, 6 October 1822) was an Italian general and noble who served in the Kingdom of Italy during the Napoleonic Wars and in the Austrian Empire. He was named Earl of Hannover and governor of Piacenza by Napoleon Bonaparte.

== Biography ==
An ardent Jacobin, he enlisted in the Lombard Legion, the first army unit of the newly formed Cisalpine Republic, shortly after the French invasion of northern Italy and, by 1798, reached the rank of colonel.

In 1800, after being promoted to the rank of brigadier general, he led the 1er Brigade of the Cisalpine troops and served in the division commanded by Giuseppe Lechi, protecting, near Mincio river, the operation of the French army under Napoleon Bonaparte, that was crossing the Po in the campaign that ended in the Battle of Marengo.

In 1805, he was named to command the place of Milan, and, the following year, joined the marshal André Masséna in his campaign against the Kingdom of Naples, that fell under the French rule after brief combat.

In 1807, he was sent on the aid of the Italian general Pietro Teulié, who was besieging the fortress of Kolberg, in Prussia. After the death of Teulié he received the command ad interim of the division and, in June, conquered the fortified position. The following month the division under his command took the Swedish fort of Stralsund, one of the last actions of the entire war. For his distinguished service, he was awarded with the rank of division general, and took command of the 1er division d'infanterie de l'Armée d'Italie (i.e. First Infantry Division of the Italian Army), stationed in Padua.

At the start of the War of the Fifth Coalition, in 1809, his division fought in Sacile under Prince Eugène, in the opening movement of the campaign that lead to the Battle of Wagram. It was from this period the remarkable note on him written by one of his fellow officers, the Italian Colonel Carlo Zucchi:

He to tell the truth was an intrepid soldier in front of the major dangers, had great uprightness of the soul, but then he let him go to the major flatteries towards the French; he constantly used their language by writing or by speaking in the midst of Italian soldiers, and rather than cause some trouble to the superior officers of the French army, he would have omitted to act with fairness to his subalterns.
