= Battle of Nerenstetten =

1805 battle during the War of the Third Coalition

- Part of the War of the Third Coalition
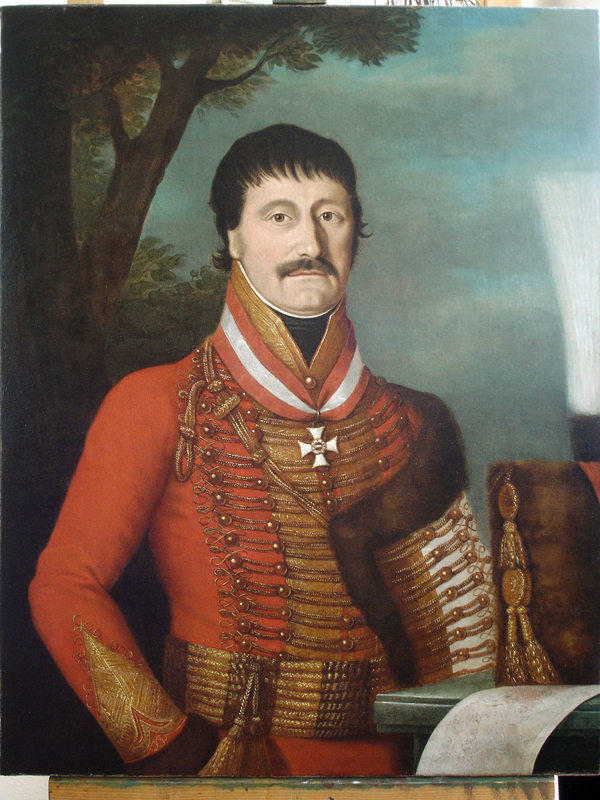
- General Dániel Mecséry
Date	16 October 1805
Location	Nerenstetten, Baden-Württemberg 48.528889°N 10.099167°E
Result	French victory

Belligerents
(France) French Empire	Habsburg monarchy

Commanders and leaders
(France) Joachim Murat	(Habsburg monarchy) Daniel Mécsery

Strength
Unknown	Unknown

Casualties and losses
Unknown	2,500 prisoners

The Battle of Nerenstetten took place on 16 October 1805. It took place during the German campaign of 1805. A cavalry corps of the First French Empire was commanded by Marshal Joachim Murat. This French cavalry corps caught up with the division of General Daniel Mécsery. Mecséry's division had been detached from the Austrian corps of General Franz von Werneck. Werneck's corps was attempting to escape the encirclement of Ulm. After a hard fight, Mecséry withdrew during the night. During this withdrawal, he abandoned 2,500 prisoners. He rejoined the rest of Werneck's corps. This corps was caught up the following day during the Battle of Neresheim. After a final march, Werneck and his exhausted men had to surrender to Murat on 18 October. However, the sacrifice of this corps allowed Archduke Ferdinand Karl Joseph of Austria-Este to escape his pursuers. Ferdinand reached the Kingdom of Bohemia with the rest of his troops.Ferdinand reached the Kingdom of Bohemia with the rest of his troops.
