= 4th Kharkov Uhlan Regiment =

- Харьковский 4-й уланский полк
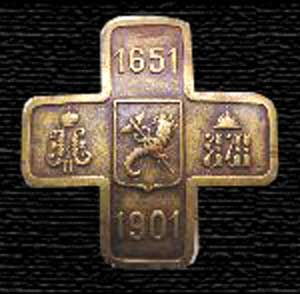
- Badge of the Regiment
- Active: 1651—1918
- Country: Russian Empire
- Branch: Imperial Russian Army
- Type: Cavalry
- Role: Uhlans
- Part of: 4th Cavalry Division
- Garrison/HQ: Chyhyryn (1820), Białystok (1913)
- Anniversaries: 27 February 1819
- Engagements: War of the Third Coalition; French invasion of Russia; Russo-Turkish War (1877–1878); World War I

Commanders
- Notable commanders: List of Regiment commanders

Private (Uhlan Bogdashkin, Petr Sergeevich) of the 4th Kharkov Uhlan Regiment in full dress uniform until 1882

The 4th Kharkov Uhlan Regiment (Russian: Харьковский 4-й уланский полк) was a cavalry regiment of the Imperial Russian Army formed in 1651 in Kharkiv, Tsardom of Russia, and served as a Kharkiv Regiment garrisoned in Chyhyryn (1820) and Białystok (1913).

== Regiment history ==
- 1651 – Kharkiv Sloboda Cossack Regiment from the Cherkasy settlement.
- May 3, 1765 – the teams of Georgian Hussar and other Sloboda regiments were added, and the major of the Life Guards Izmailovsky Regiment Efim Shcherbinin was formed in the city Kharkov as Kharkov Hussar Regiment.
- June 26, 1783 – reorganized into a 6-squadron structure and named the Kharkov Hussar Regiment.
- 1784 – Kharkov Light Horse Regiment.
- 1790 – Kharkov Horse-Jaeger Regiment.
- 1792 – Kharkov Light Horse Regiment.
- 1796 – Kharkov cuirassier Regiment.
- 1798 – Cuirassier General Major Zaplatin Regiment.
- 1798 – Cuirassier General Major Prince Romodanovsky-Ladyzhensky Regiment.
- 1799 – Cuirassier General Major Cozens Regiment.
- 1801 – Kharkov Cuirassier Regiment.
- 1801 – Kharkov Dragoon Regiment.
- 1827 – Kharkov Uhlan Regiment.
- 1851 – Uhlan Regiment of His Royal Highness Prince Ferdinand of Prussia.
- 1857 – Kharkov Ulan Regiment of His Royal Highness Prince Ferdinand of Prussia;
- 1863 – Kharkov Uhlan Regiment.
- 1864 – 4th Ulan Kharkov Regiment.
- April 23, 1864 – 4th Ulan Kharkov Regiment of Her Imperial Highness Grand Duchess Alexandra Petrovna.
- August 18, 1882 – 11th Kharkov Dragoon Regiment of Her Imperial Highness Grand Duchess Alexandra Petrovna.
- December 6, 1907 – 4th Uhlan Kharkov Regiment.

== Regiment commanders ==
years	Rank	Name
03.03.1765 — 22.04.1774	Colonel	Chorba, Nikolai Ivanovich
22.04.1774 — 14.08.1774	Colonel	Galos, Osip
21.09.1774 — 10.02.1778	Colonel	Bedriaga, Akim
16.02.1778 — 11.10.1783	Brigadier	Vysotsky, Nikolai Petrovich
09.11.1790 — 26.03.1790	Brigadier	Neplyuev, Ivan Nikolaevich
03.06.1790 — хх.хх.1796	Brigadier	Bour, Karl Fedorovich
хх.хх.1796 — 16.11.1797	Colonel	Friz, Karl Fedorovich
16.11.1797 — 29.11.1797	Colonel	Grushetsky, Vasily Vasilievich
31.03.1798 — 05.10.1798	Colonel	Zaplatin, Semyon Grigorievich
25.01.1799 — 04.06.1799	Colonel	Gelfreich, Karl Borisovich
04.06.1799 — 08.09.1799	Colonel	Kamenev, Sergei Andreevich
04.12.1799 — 15.10.1800	Colonel	Portnyagin, Semyon Andreevich
23.11.1800 — 16.05.1803	Colonel	Dekhterev, Vladimir Semenovich
10.07.1803 — 12.01.1804	Podpolkovnik	Dimitri Mikhailovich Youzefovitch
12.01.1804 — 25.05.1806	Colonel	Minitsky, Dmitry Andreevich
23.06.1806 — 11.08.1810	Podpolkovnik	Dimitri Mikhailovich Youzefovitch
11.08.1810 — хх.хх.1814	Major	Victor von Prendel
хх.хх.1814 — 17.12.1815	Major	Zasyadko
07.12.1815 — 24.01.1816	Podpolkovnik	Semyako, Ivan Pavlovich
10.02.1816 — 19.03.1820	Colonel	de Juncker, Karl Filippovich
28.03.1820 — 24.11.1823	Podpolkovnik	Snarsky, Konstantin Stanislavovich
12.12.1823 — 08.01.1826	Colonel	Kanchiyalov, Georgy Alexandrovich
19.03.1826 — 16.09.1826	Colonel	Gelman, Karl Evstafievich
16.09.1826 — 14.06.1830	Colonel	Joseph Carl von Anrep
14.06.1830 — 06.06.1831	Podpolkovnik	Dits, Mikhail Andreevich
19.05.1832 — 23.01.1840	Colonel	Beklemishev, Dmitry Nikolaevich
09.02.1840 — 08.03.1842	Colonel	Vitovsky, Osip Petrovich
08.03.1842 — 23.03.1847	Colonel	von Kroneck, Fedor Adamovich
23.03.1847 — 12.11.1854	Colonel	Zementsky, Vladislav Kasperovich
12.11.1854 — 01.09.1860	Colonel	Stankevich, Platon Mikhailovich
01.09.1860 — 22.06.1861	Colonel	Gudima, Alexey Stepanovich
22.06.1861 — 05.05.1866	Colonel	Baumgarten, Ferdinand Ermolaevich
05.05.1866 — 27.09.1866	Colonel	Baron Pritvits, Ivan Karlovich
27.09.1866 — 07.01.1870	Colonel	Chernov, Nikolai Pakhomovich
28.01.1870 — 27.06.1875	Colonel	Count Nirod, Nikolai Evstafievich
27.06.1875 — 13.06.1881	Colonel	Ertel, Viktor Ivanovich
13.06.1891 — 02.08.1891	Colonel	Palitsin, Vladimir Alekseevich
08.08.1891 — 02.07.1896	Colonel	Weymarn, Ivan Ivanovich
29.07.1896 — 16.08.1900	Colonel	Oboleshev, Alexander Dmitrievich
24.10.1900 — 10.03.1902	Colonel	von Krusenstern, Nikolai Fedorovich
16.04.1902 — 03.11.1904	Colonel	Lyubomirov, Pavel Petrovich
29.01.1905 — 06.12.1907	Colonel	Krasovsky, Bronislav Ivanovich
04.12.1907 — 17.09.1912	Colonel	von Krug, Viktor Platonovich
30.09.1912 — 08.03.1917	Colonel	Nikolaev, Stepan Leonidovich
08.03.1917 — хх.хх.хххх	Colonel	Valitsky, Vladimir Vyacheslavovich

== Uniform ==
Full dress uniform for Dragoons of the 11th Kharkov Dragoon Regiment, after 1882

Uniform (with greatcoat) for Dragoons of the 11th Kharkov Dragoon Regiment, after 1882
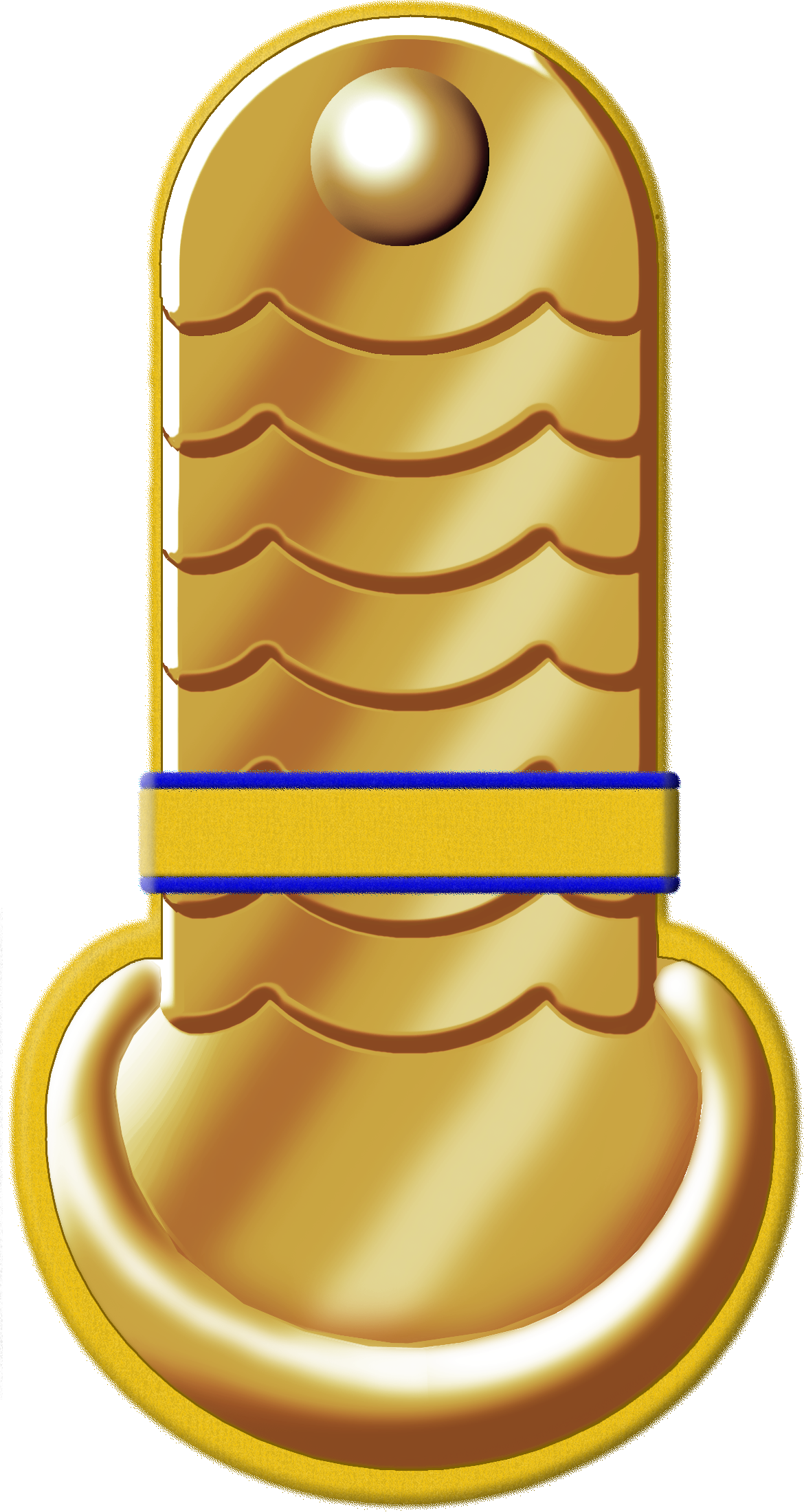
Uhlan epaulet (1872), 4th Kharkov Uhlan Regiment

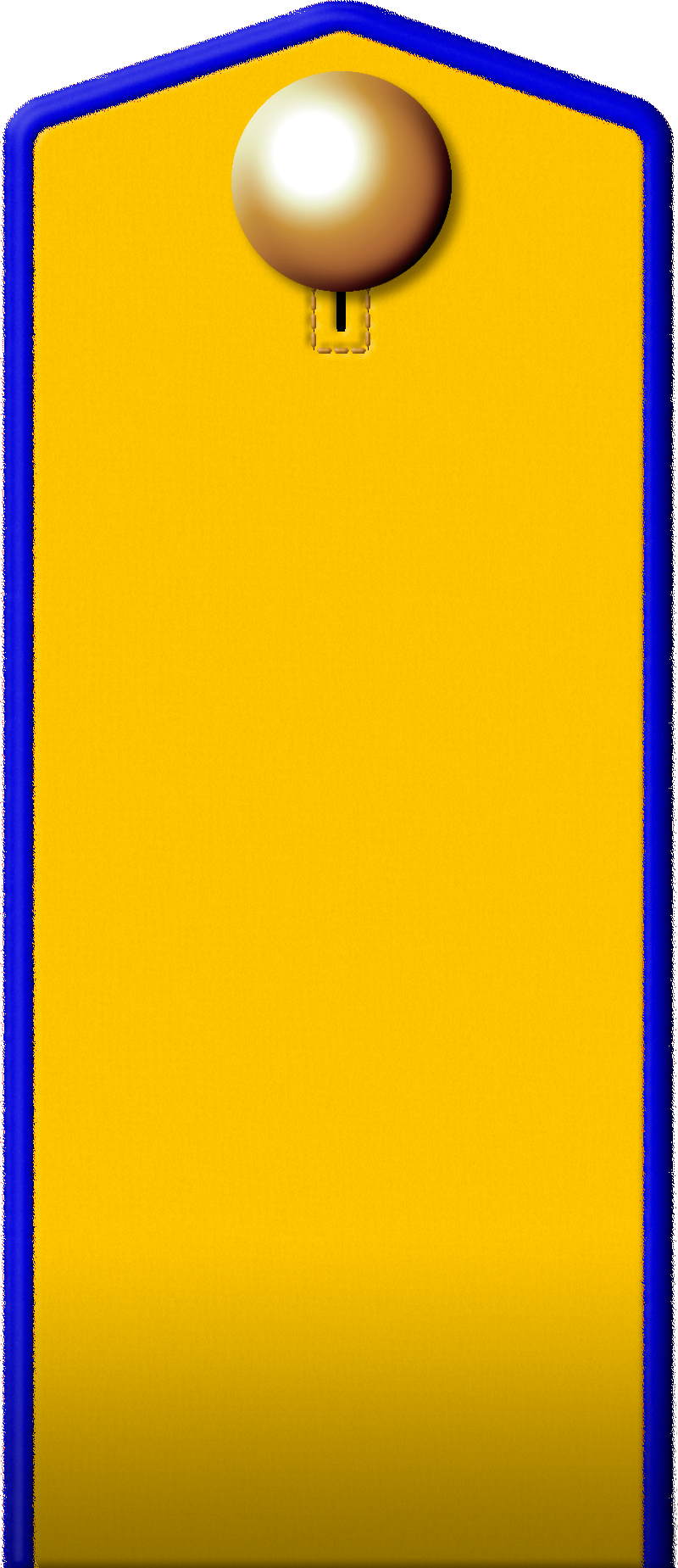
Uhlan shoulder straps (1872), 4th Kharkov Uhlan Regiment

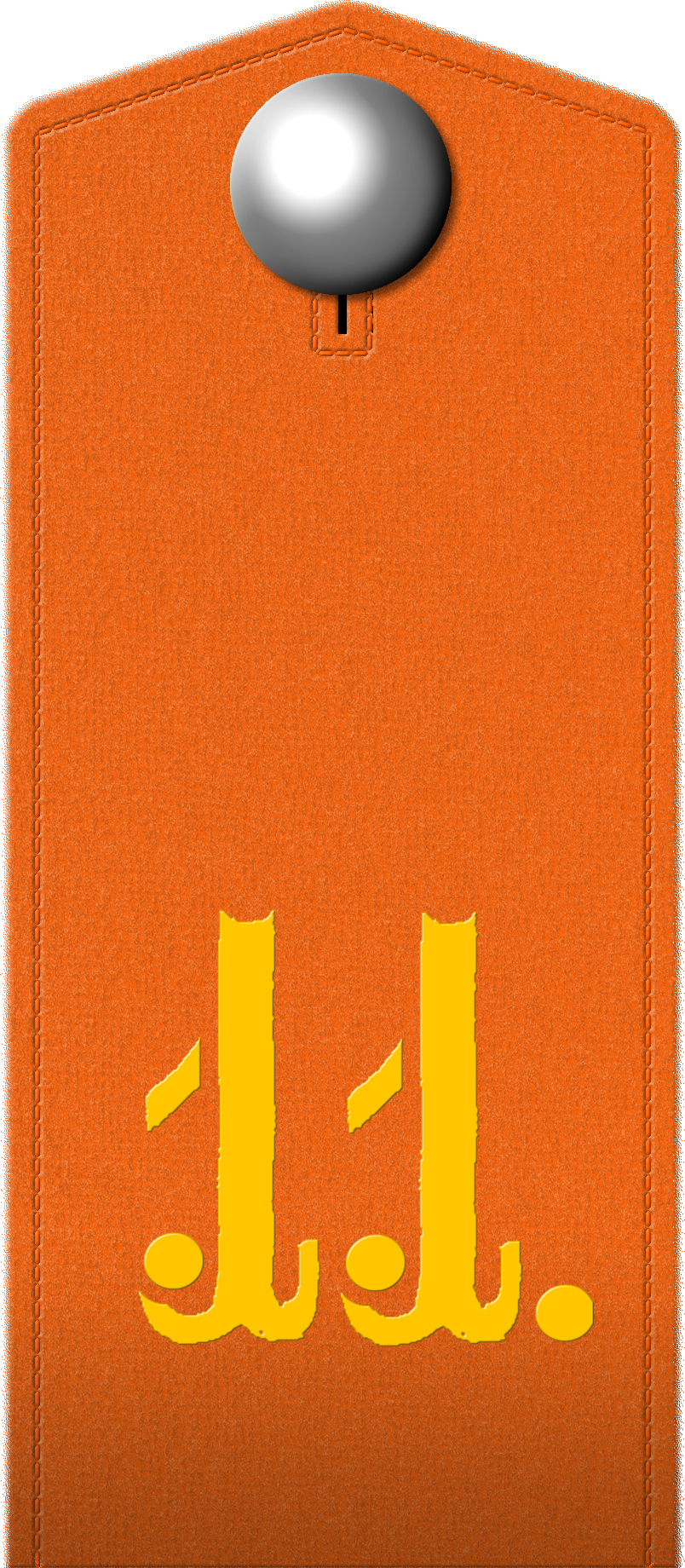
Dragoon shoulder straps (1882), 11th Kharkov Dragoon Regiment

== Sources ==
- Ministry of Defence of the Russian Federation (2023). "4th Kharkov Uhlan Regiment, 1651 — 1918 = 4-й уланский Харьковский полк. Годы существования: 1651 — 1918" (in Russian).
- "Section 7. Funds of infantry and cavalry brigades, detachments, regiments and individual units = Раздел 7. Фонды пехотных и кавалерийских бригад, отрядов, полков и отдельных частей. (7. 3. 1046. 4-й уланский Харьковский полк. Фонды Российского государственного военно-исторического архива. Фонд № 3577. Опись 1. 1800-1918 гг. 182 ед. хр.)". Russian State Military Historical Archive. Guide = Российский государственный военно-исторический архив. Путеводитель. Vol. 2. Moscow: «Российская политическая энциклопедия». 2007. ISBN 978-5-8243-0708-5.
- "4th Cavalry Division War Log = Журнал военных действий 4-й кавалерийской дивизии" (PDF). War logs of the 1st, 4th and 9th Cavalry Divisions = Журналы военных действий 1-й, 4-й и 9-й кавалерийских дивизий. Vol. 7 (Collection of materials on the Russian-Turkish war of 1877-1878 on the Balkan Peninsula = Сборник материалов по русско-турецкой войне 1877-1878 гг. на Балканском полуострове ed.). Saint Petersburg: Военная типография. 1898. pp. 71–117.
