= Pierre François Joseph Durutte =

French army officer (1767–1827)

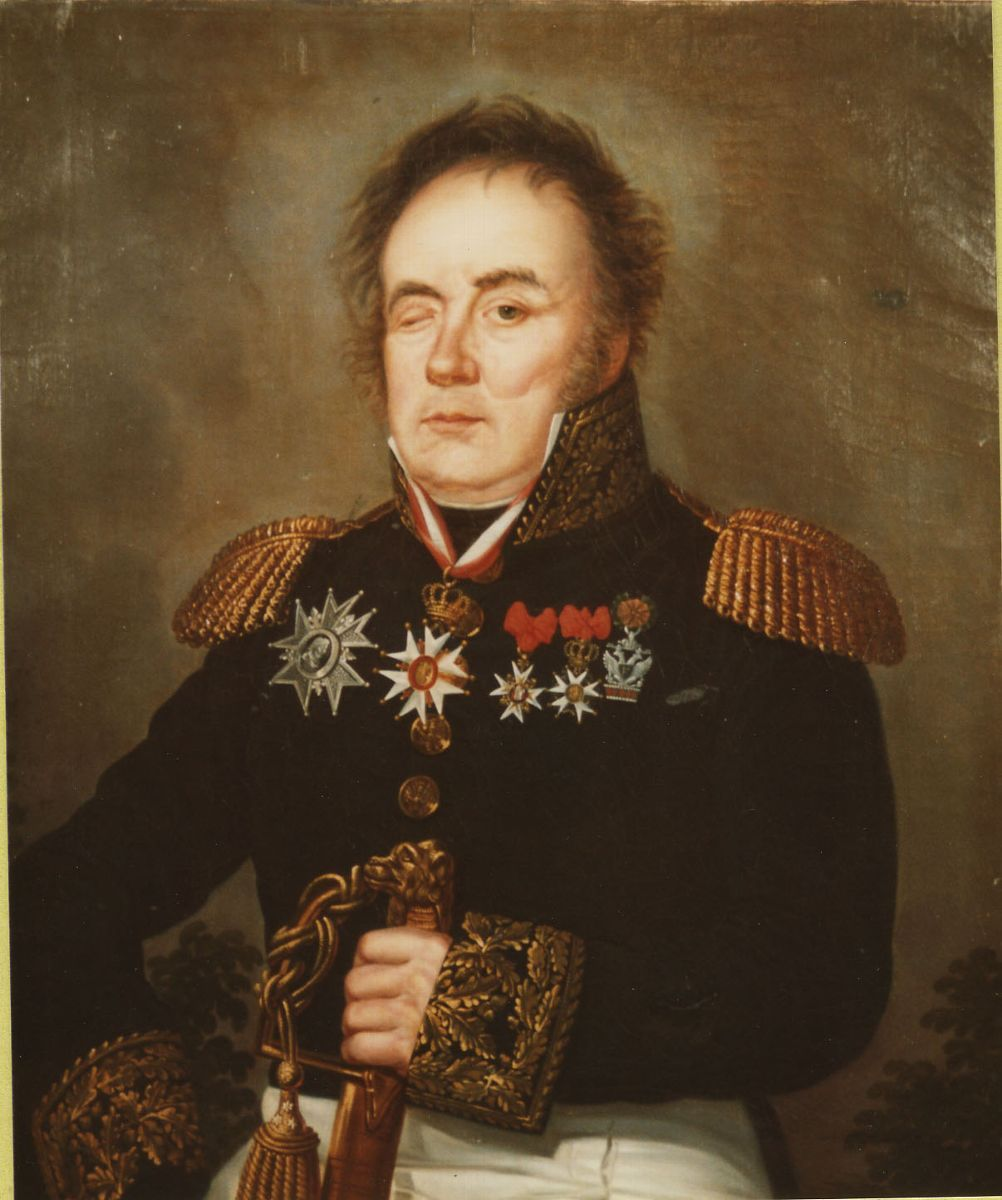
- Portrait of General Durutte (1815)
- Born: 13 July 1767; Douai, France
- Died: 18 April 1827 (aged 59) Ypres, The Netherlands
- Allegiance: France
- Branch: Infantry, Staff
- Service years: 1792–1815
- Rank: General of Division
- Conflicts: French Revolutionary Wars; Napoleonic Wars
- Awards: Légion d'Honneur; Order of Saint Louis

Pierre François Joseph Durutte (French pronunciation: [pjɛʁ fʁɑ̃swa ʒozɛf dyʁyt]; 13 July 1767 – 18 April 1827) joined the French army at the beginning of the French Revolutionary Wars. Rapidly promoted for feats of bravery under fire at Jemappes in 1792 and Hondschoote in 1793, he found himself appointed to serve as a staff officer. He distinguished himself during the Anglo-Russian invasion of Holland in 1799 and received promotion to general officer. During the successful 1800 campaign he fought in Jean Victor Marie Moreau's army. Promoted again in 1803, his career then stalled because of his association with the banished Moreau and his unwillingness to see Napoleon Bonaparte as emperor.

After several years of garrison duty, Durutte was sent to a combat command in Italy in 1809. During the War of the Fifth Coalition he led his division in action at the Piave, Tarvis, Sankt Michael, Raab, and Wagram. He led a division in Russia in 1812 and managed to bring the unit back to western Germany intact. He fought in the War of the Sixth Coalition in 1813, defended Metz in 1814, and led a division at Waterloo in 1815. Durutte is one of the names inscribed under the Arc de Triomphe.

== Revolution ==
Born into a well-to-do merchant family on 13 July 1767 in Douai, he obtained an excellent education as a youth. He enlisted in the 3rd Nord Volunteer Battalion in 1792 after the outbreak of the French Revolution. He fought at the Battle of Jemappes on 6 November 1792 was appointed lieutenant. For notable courage in the storming of a Dutch fort at Klundert from 1 to 4 March 1793, Durutte became a captain. He was offered the rank of adjutant general, but hesitated to accept because he felt that he did not merit the promotion. During the Battle of Hondschoote on 6 to 8 September 1793, he served as the chief of staff to one of the divisions. He was later chief of staff to Jean Le Michaud d'Arçon.

In 1795 he became chief of staff to Jean Victor Marie Moreau who commanded the Army of the North. He later served under Joseph Souham in Holland. On 19 September 1799, he led the advance-guard in Herman Willem Daendels' division at the Battle of Bergen. For his battlefield exploits, he became a general of brigade on 26 September 1799. He also fought in Guillaume Marie Anne Brune's victory at the Battle of Castricum on 6 October. Again serving under Moreau, he participated in the Battle of Messkirch on 5 May 1800 and the Battle of Biberach four days later. On 3 December at the Battle of Hohenlinden, he led a brigade in Charles Mathieu Isidore Decaen's division. Led by Durutte, Decaen's troops arrived on the field late in the morning. But they quickly pitched into the fighting and drove back the Austrians of Johann Sigismund Riesch's left column. After the peace, he assumed command of the Department of Lys.

== Early Empire ==
On 27 August 1803, Durutte received promotion to general of division in spite of Napoleon Bonaparte's dislike of officers from Moreau's army. He became a member of the Légion d'Honneur on 11 December 1803 and a commander of the Légion on 9 June 1804. His former relationship with Moreau, who was exiled from France, then caused trouble. When asked to put his signature on a document agreeing with Napoleon's appointment as emperor of France, Durutte remained true to his republican beliefs and refused to sign. When his officers also offered to join him in defiance, he dissuaded them so their careers would not be ruined. After this incident, apparently no one wanted to have anything to do with him except Marshal Louis-Nicolas Davout, who gave him command of the island of Elba. He remained in this isolated post for three years.

His fortunes improved in 1809 when he was given command of a combat division in Italy under Eugène de Beauharnais. His troops included the 3rd and 4th Battalions of the 22nd Light Infantry Regiment, four battalions each of the 23rd and 62nd Line Infantry Regiments, and a foot artillery company consisting of four 6-pound cannons and two 6-inch howitzers. He missed the Battle of Sacile in mid-April. After the Battle of Caldiero at the end of April, Eugène launched a pursuit of Archduke John's retreating army. While the rest of his troops chased John, Eugène directed Durutte on a southerly route to first relieve the siege of Venice and then to rejoin the main army on the Piave River.

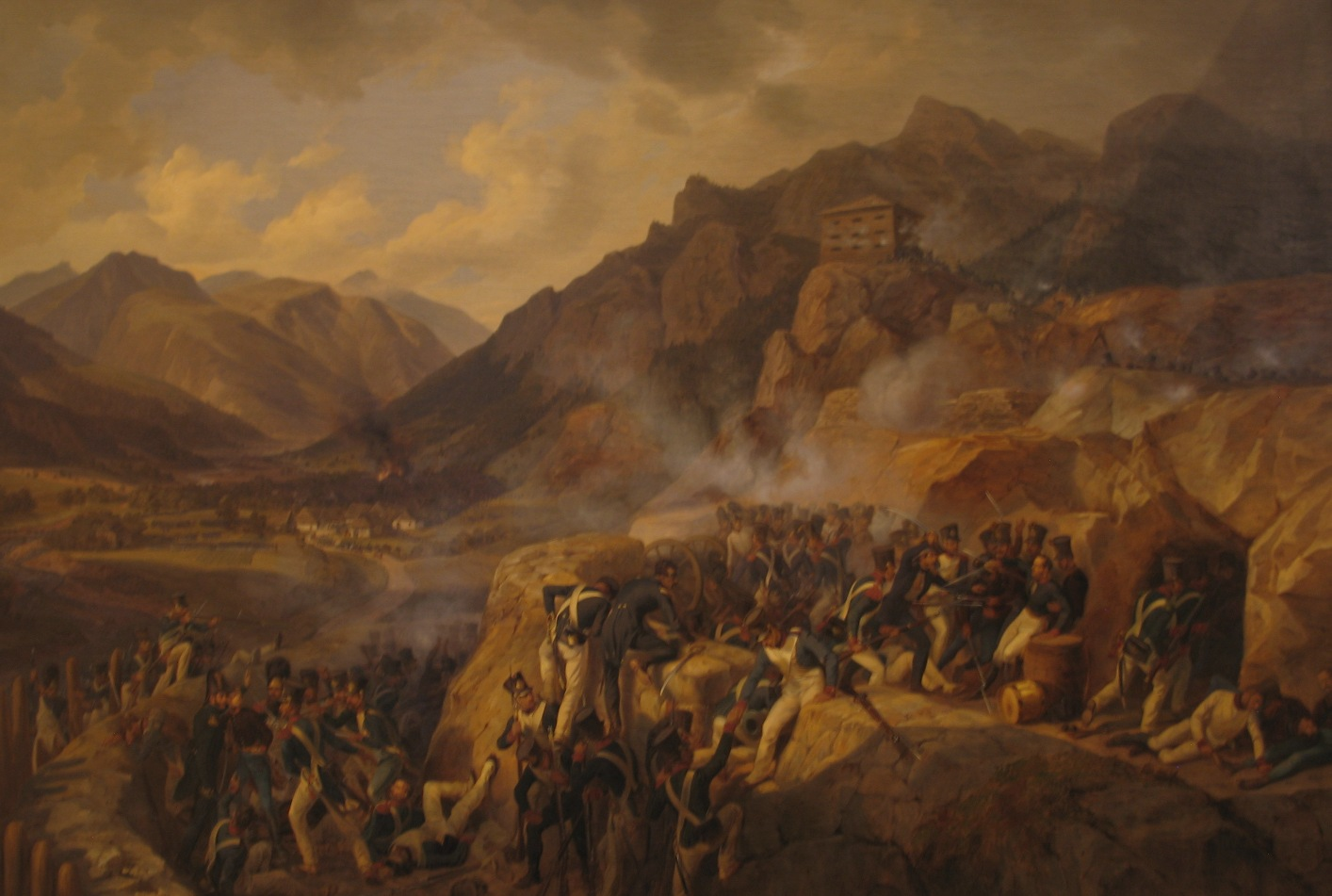
Durutte's and Pacthod's divisions storm the Malborghetto Fort by Albrecht Adam

On 8 May 1809, Durutte's division was present at the Battle of Piave River as part of Paul Grenier's corps. Instead of four battalions of the 62nd, his division's order of battle included two battalions each of the 60th and 62nd Line Infantry Regiments. During the battle the river rose dramatically and only half of his division was able to get into the fighting, where they fought in the center under Jacques MacDonald. On 17 May, Durutte led his division at the Battle of Tarvis. That morning his troops stormed the Malborghetto Fort from the west while Michel Marie Pacthod's division attacked from the east. Both divisions were under the direction of Grenier. After a brief but heroic resistance, the fort's defenders were overrun. Later that day, Durutte's soldiers moved east to Tarvisio to confront Albert Gyulai's entrenched troops. While Eugène sent Achille Fontanelli's Italians to turn the Austrian flank, Grenier's two divisions mounted a frontal assault. Gyulai's men fled after suffering heavy losses.

Durutte fought in the Battle of Sankt Michael on 25 May. When French scouts detected Franz Jellacic's Austrian division moving across his front, Eugène ordered Grenier to intercept it with the troops at hand. Grenier's first division under Jean Mathieu Seras arrived at Sankt Michael around 10:00 am and mounted an attack, pinning Jellacic in position. When Durutte arrived after a forced march, he put François Valentin's brigade in the second line, Joseph Marie, Count Dessaix's brigade in reserve, and two battalions of the 62nd Regiment on the south bank of the Mur River to envelop Jellacic's left flank. Seras' two brigades were told off to attack the Austrian right flank and center. In the face of this concentric attack Jellacic's force collapsed with very heavy losses.

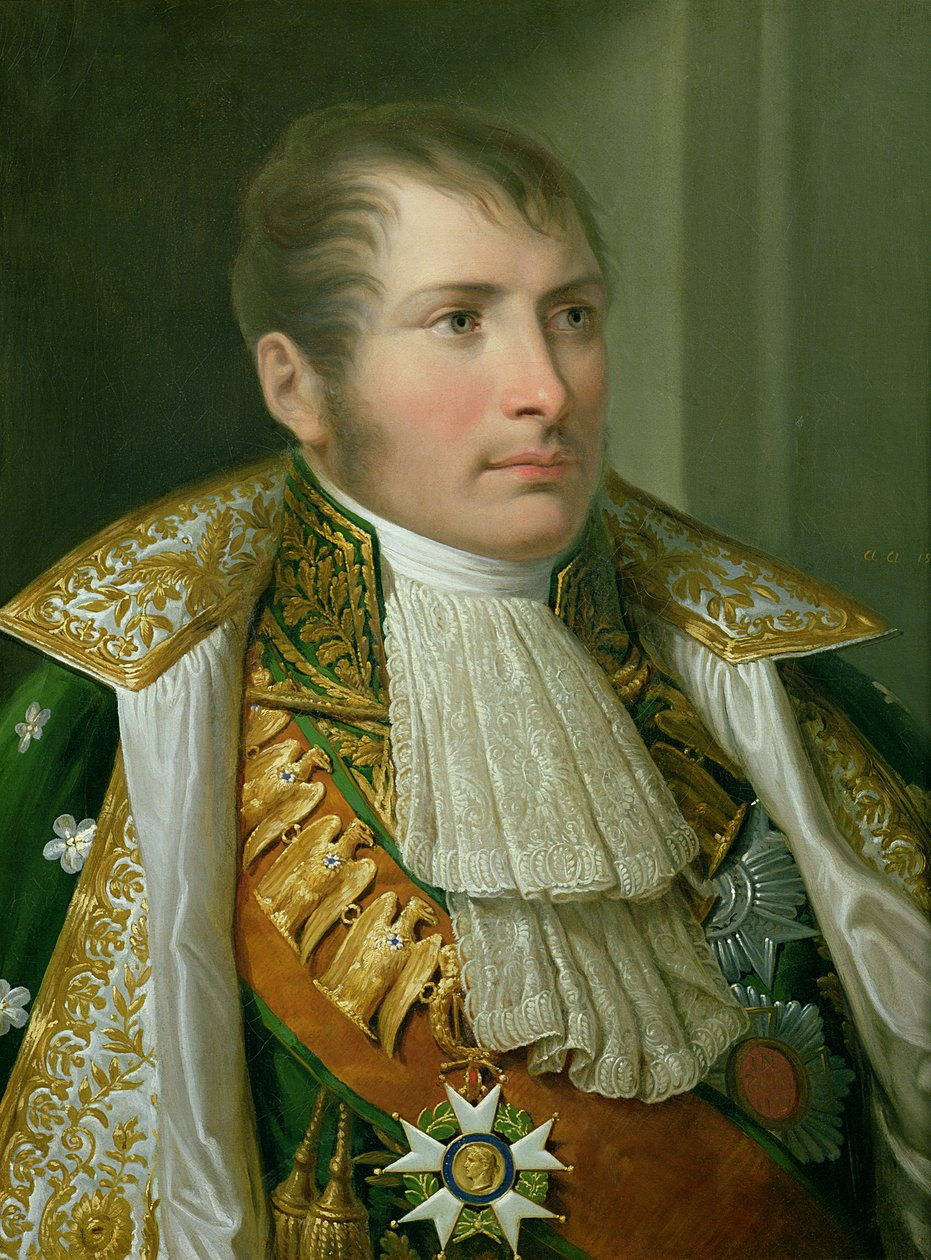
Eugène de Beauharnais

On 14 June 1809, Durutte led his division in the Battle of Raab. The 1st Brigade comprised one battalion of the 22nd Light, four battalions of the 23rd Line, and three battalions of the 60th Line Infantry Regiments. The 2nd Brigade had three battalions each of the 62nd and 103rd Line Infantry Regiments. Four squadrons of the 6th Chasseurs à Cheval and six 6-pound guns were attached. Archduke John deployed his army behind a stream, with a strongpoint in the center at the Kis-Megyer Farm. Eugène sent forward two infantry divisions, with Seras on the right and Durutte on the left. Arranged in two lines of battalion columns, the divisions advanced in echelon, with Seras leading. From the first, rough terrain caused problems and Durutte's division struck the Austrian line first. Seras finally got into action but proved unable to seize Kis-Megyar. Eugène put in Philippe Eustache Louis Severoli's division on Durutte's left to keep the attack rolling. At this time an Austrian counterattack broke Durutte's division and the first line of Severoli's. Eugène helped rally Durutte's men while sending in Pacthod's division as reinforcements. By this time Emmanuel Grouchy's cavalry had overwhelmed John's left flank and Kis-Megyar had fallen, causing John to order a withdrawal.

On the first day of the Battle of Wagram, 5 July 1809, Durutte's division participated in the unsuccessful evening attack on the Russbach line and was routed along with the rest of Eugène's attacking force. On the second day, MacDonald assaulted the Austrian center with three divisions. When this attack stalled, Napoleon ordered Eugène to send in his last two divisions. Accordingly, Pacthod was committed on MacDonald's right, while Durutte was committed on his left, where he engaged the Austrians of Johann Kollowrat's III Armeekorps. Durutte's men overcame the opposition and captured the village of Breitenlee. For his efforts at Wagram, he was honored with the Order of the Iron Crown on 17 July 1809. He was appointed Baron of the Empire on 15 August 1809.

== Later Empire ==
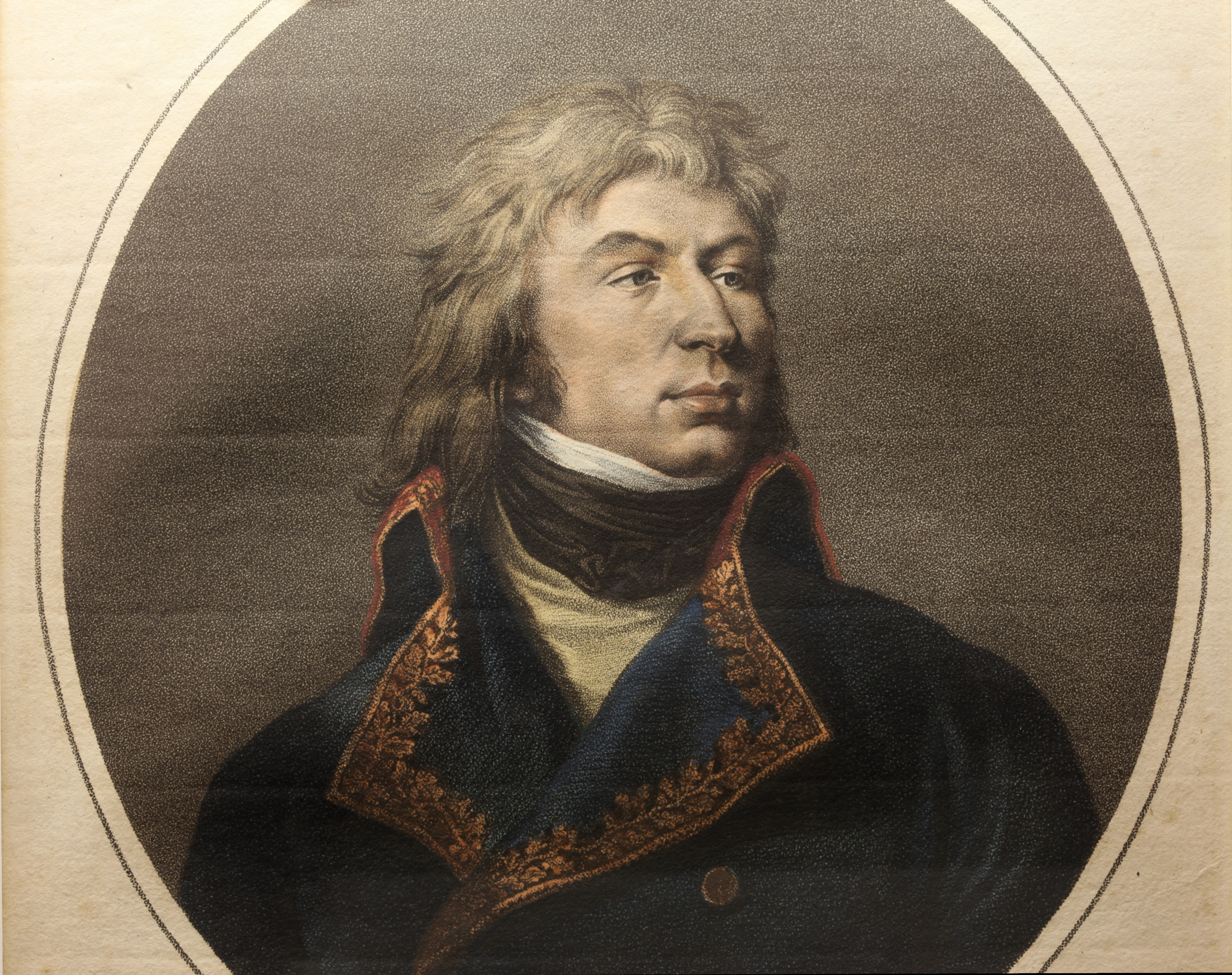
Jean Louis Reynier

After serving a few months as military governor of Amsterdam, Durutte was appointed as commander of the 31st military division and settled in Groningen. He took command of the 32nd Infantry Division in Marshal Pierre Augereau's XI Corps in November 1812 and settled in Berlin and Warsaw. Detached to Jean Reynier's VII Saxon Corps, his troops fought against Fabian Gottlieb von Osten-Sacken's Russians at the Battle of Wolkowisk from 14 to 16 November. During the battle, his division repelled repeated enemy attacks on the Wolkowisk bridge. After hearing of the destruction of the Grande Armée, Durutte withdrew to Kalisz in the Duchy of Warsaw, where he fended off a pursuing column of Russians. Later he fell back to Glogau in the Kingdom of Prussia and from there he brought his division back to Jena where he joined Eugène with 3,000 veterans on 1 April 1813.

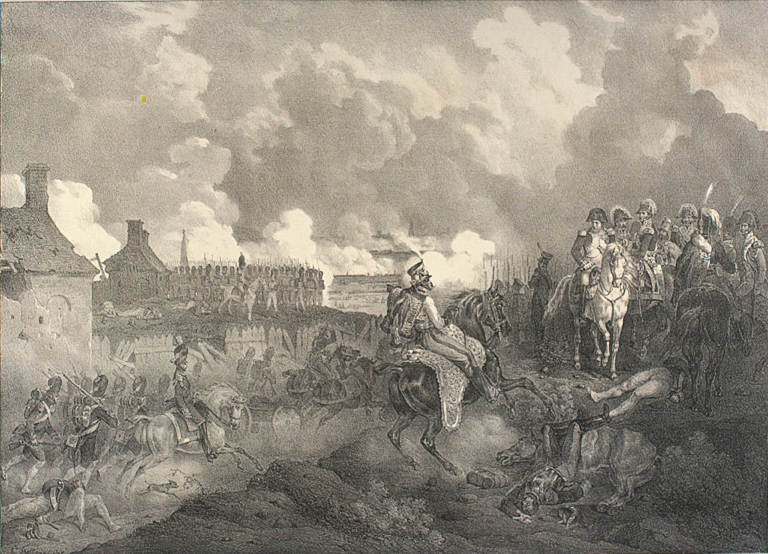
Battle of Bautzen, 20–21 May 1813

Still in Reynier's VII Corps, Durutte led the 32nd Division at the Battle of Bautzen on 20 and 21 May 1813. He fought at the Battle of Grossbeeren on 23 August. On this occasion, his division was made up of the 3rd and 4th Battalions of the 131st, 132nd, and 133rd Line Infantry Regiments, the 1st Battalion of the 35th Light Infantry Regiment, the 4th Battalion of the 36th Light Infantry Regiment, and the 2nd and 3rd Battalions of the Würzburg Infantry Regiment. He led his troops at the Battle of Dennewitz on 6 September. At the battle, Marie Jean Baptiste Urbain Devaux's brigade included the 35th Light, 131st Line, and 132nd Line Infantry Regiments. Antoine Anatole Gedeon Jarry's brigade consisted of 36th Light, 133rd Line, and Wurzburg Infantry Regiments. He fought at the Battle of Leipzig from 16 to 19 October. The organization of the 32nd Division was similar to the earlier battles, except that each regiment had only one battalion.

During the retreat to France, Durutte led his troops in a clash at Freyburg on 21 October. He fought at the Battle of Hanau on 30 and 31 October under Marshal Auguste Marmont's command. In 1814 he was given command of the fortress of Metz which resisted a blockade until the end of the war. At one point, Napoleon heard a rumor that Metz had fallen. He asked an aide-de-camp who commanded the garrison. When told it was Durutte, he replied, "I have never done anything good for that man. Metz is still ours." (Napoleon was becoming convinced that generals on whom he had showered favors were not performing well, while those who had yet to prove themselves could be counted on.) Upon the return of King Louis XVIII, Durutte recognized the new sovereign and was given command of the 3rd Division and made a Chevalier of the Order of Saint Louis on 27 June. He was made a Grand Officer of the Légion d'Honneur on 23 August and received a gold sword from the mayor of Metz.

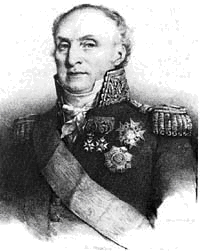
Jean Baptiste Drouet d'Erlon

During the Hundred Days Durutte rallied to Napoleon. He was assigned to command the 4th Division of Jean-Baptiste Drouet, Comte d'Erlon's I Corps. Under his command were eight battalions of the 8th, 29th, 85th, and 95th Line Infantry Regiments. The 8th and 29th were commanded by Jean-Gaudens-Claude Pégot, while the 85th and 95th were led by Jean-Louis Brue. On 16 June 1815, his corps commander d'Erlon received conflicting orders from his wing commander Marshal Michel Ney and one of Napoleon's aides, Charles de la Bédoyère. After following de la Bédoyère's order to march to Ligny, he then received Ney's order of recall. Having arrived near the field where the Battle of Ligny was raging, d'Erlon decided to detach Durutte's division and Charles Claude Jacquinot's cavalry. As d'Erlon returned to Ney's wing with his other three infantry divisions, his only instruction to Durutte was to "be prudent". Jacquinot cleared the road of Prussian cavalry, but Durutte stopped at the village of Wagnelée, even as it became clear that the Prussians were retreating. Brigadier Brue, frustrated by his superior's inaction, insubordinately demanded that the division advance. But Durutte, overwhelmed by his responsibility, refused to budge and a great opportunity passed, one of several mischances for the French that day. As it happened, d'Erlon arrived too late to assist Ney in the Battle of Quatre Bras.

At the Battle of Waterloo on 18 June 1815, the 4th Division was posted on the extreme right flank of the army. Opposite Durutte's division were 3,400 Nassau infantry from the brigade of Prince Bernhard of Saxe-Weimar. These troops occupied, from Durutte's right to left, Château Frischermont, the hamlet of Smohain, La Haye farm, and Papelotte farm. Durutte sent the 2nd Brigade to attack these positions, supported three horse artillery batteries, two from Édouard Jean Baptiste Milhaud's IV Cavalry Corps and one belonging to Jacquinot's division. Meanwhile, his 2,100-man 1st Brigade advanced in column of divisions by battalion. This meant that the brigade's four battalions were each deployed in a 3-deep line, one behind the other in a mass 200 yards (183 m) wide and 12 ranks deep. The 1st Brigade linked with the 3rd Division of Pierre-Louis Binet de Marcognet on Durutte's left flank.

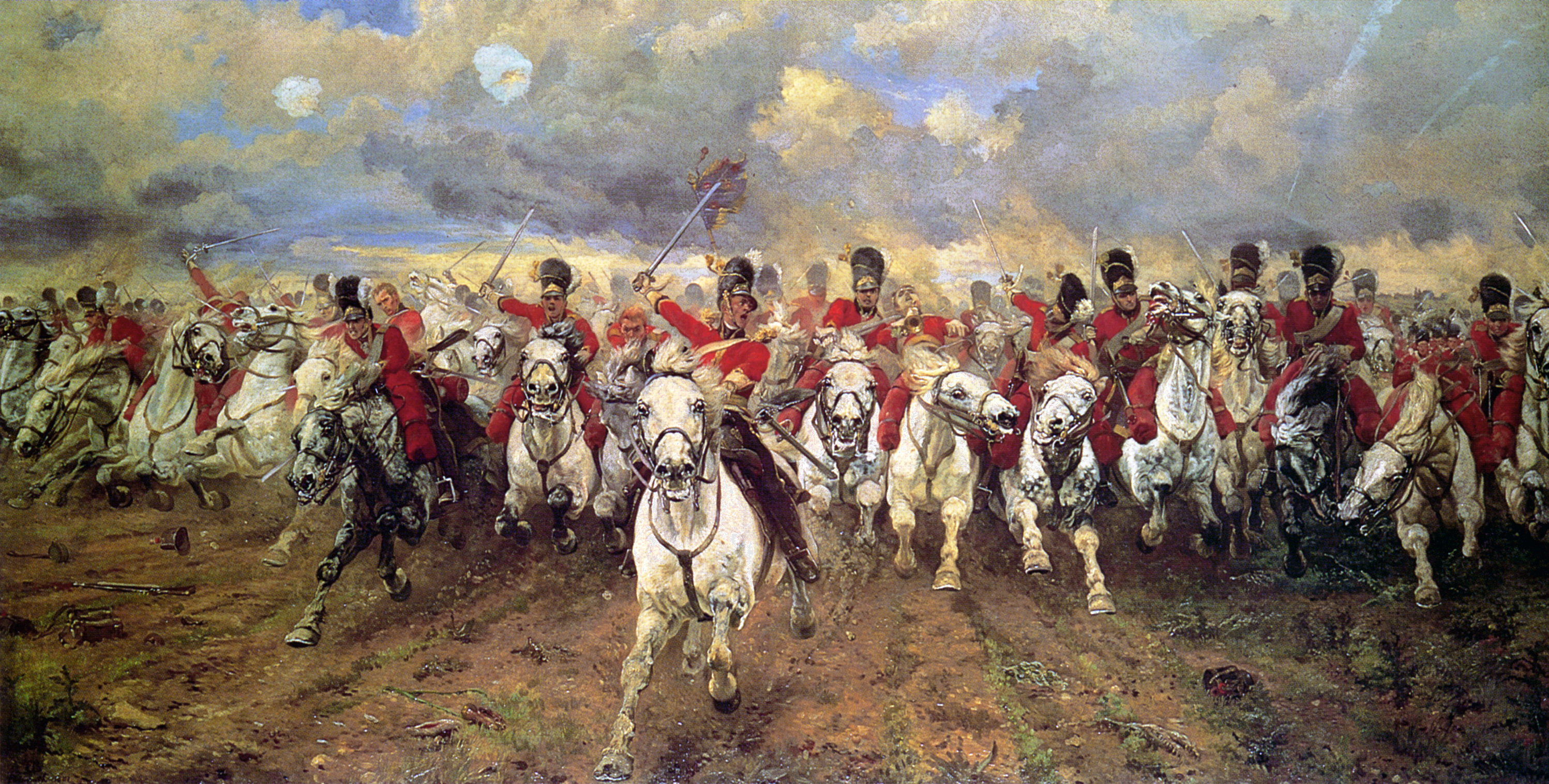
Scotland Forever by Lady Elizabeth Butler. The Scots Greys smashed one French division but were repulsed by Durutte's 1st Brigade.

As Marcognet's division crested the ridge, the 2nd Scots Greys Dragoons plowed into it and routed it. Emerging on the far side of Marcognet's shattered division, the Greys spotted Durutte's 1st Brigade and galloped toward it. The French closed ranks and the sides faced outward to receive cavalry. Coming on in dispersed order, the Greys were thoroughly repulsed and many saddles were emptied. Soon after, a so-far unengaged squadron of the 1st Royal Dragoons attacked the brigade as a disciplined body and smashed into its left flank, which was only 12-ranks deep. This time, the brigade collapsed in panic as the troops fled in every direction and a number of them surrendered.

Meanwhile, Durutte supervised the attack of his 1,700-man 2nd Brigade on the extreme right. About 1:30 PM, he sent his troops into the little valley in front of Papelotte and La Haye, covered by 18 horse artillery pieces and Jacquinot's cavalry. The original skirmish line recoiled before enemy fire and Durutte quickly reinforced it with battalions in open order. He also sent a horse battery to take Smohain under point-blank fire. Two battalions soon overran Papelotte and victory seemed to be at hand. At this moment, Durutte rode back to the ridge and found to his dismay that the 1st Brigade was crushed and the ground to his left covered with rampaging British cavalry. With the Dutch-Belgian cavalry brigade of Charles Étienne de Ghigny advancing downhill toward them, he had the men of the 2nd Brigade execute a hasty retreat covered by one of Jacquinot's regiments. The brigade was able to withdraw behind a battalion square from the VI Corps. These troops drove off Ghigny's light horsemen with the help of a nearby artillery battery.

As the Prussian attack against the VI Corps gained momentum, Georges Mouton, Comte de Lobau ordered Durutte to capture the Smohain area. Accordingly, the embattled 4th Division commander attacked Smohain with the 2nd Brigade and his artillery, while sending the two and a half battalions that remained of the 1st Brigade against Papelotte. The French infantry overran the farm and immediately began to fortify it. At the close of the day, Karl Friedrich Franziskus von Steinmetz's brigade of Hans Ernst Karl, Graf von Zieten's I Prussian Corps arrived at Smohain with 2,500 fresh infantry, followed by 3,300 cavalry. Attacking, they overcame the survivors of Durutte's division and burst through the angle of Napoleon's battle line. In the rout that followed, Durutte was chased by Prussian horsemen, receiving one saber slash that nearly cut off his left hand and a second blow that inflicted a severe head wound. After Waterloo, he retired to a property he owned near Ypres in what is now Belgium. He died there on 18 April 1827 after a prolonged illness.
