= Battle of Raab (1809) =

1809 battle during the War of the Fifth Coalition

- Part of War of the Fifth Coalition
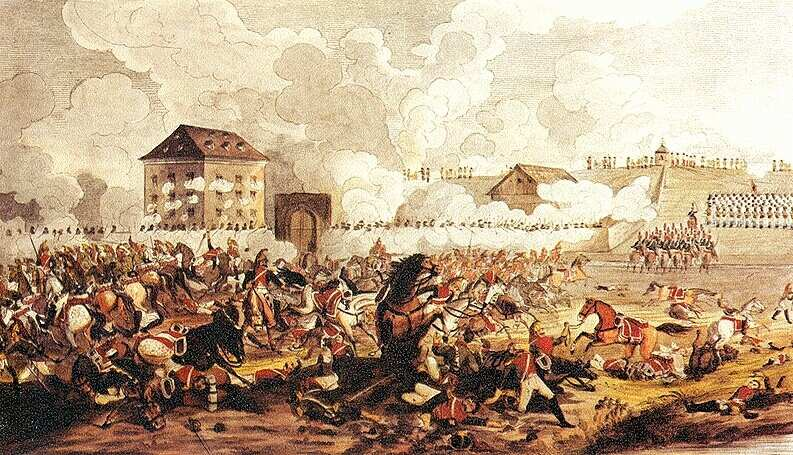
- Battle of Raab by Eduard Kaiser
Date	14 June 1809
Location	Győr (German: Raab), Kingdom of Hungary (near the village Kismegyer) 47.6441898°N 17.6626640°E
Result	Franco-Italian victory

Belligerents
French Empire; Kingdom of Italy	Austrian Empire; Kingdom of Hungary

Commanders and leaders
(Kingdom of Italy (Napoleonic)) Eugène de Beauharnais	(Austrian Empire) Archduke John; (Austrian Empire) Archduke Joseph

Strength
35,000–40,100; 42 guns	35,525–40,000: 15,001 regular infantry and cavalry; 30 guns

Casualties and losses
3,000–4,000	10,300

War of the Fifth Coalition
Battles of the War of the Fifth Coalition, shown on modern borders.
Battle of Raab
Napoleon in command
Napoleon not in command

The Battle of Raab or Battle of Győr (Hungarian: győri csata) was fought on 14 June 1809 during the Napoleonic Wars, between Franco-Italian forces and Habsburg forces. Most of the Habsburg army consisted of poorly trained Landwehr and militia. The battle was fought near Győr (Raab in German), Kingdom of Hungary, and ended in a Franco-Italian victory. The victory prevented Archduke John of Austria from bringing any significant force to the Battle of Wagram, while Prince Eugène de Beauharnais's force was able to link up with Emperor Napoleon at Vienna in time to fight at Wagram. Napoleon referred to the battle as "a granddaughter of Marengo and Friedland", as it fell on the anniversary of those two battles.

== Campaign ==
=== Early moves ===
During the 1809 campaign in Italy, Viceroy Eugène de Beauharnais led the Franco-Italian army while General der Kavallerie Archduke John of Austria commanded the Austrian army. At the outbreak of war, John moved rapidly to defeat his opponent at the Battle of Sacile on 16 April. This victory drove Eugène back to the Adige River. The front remained static for a few weeks despite attacks by Eugène in the Battle of Caldiero. Meanwhile, an Austrian force bottled up the corps of General of Division Auguste Marmont in Dalmatia. After the Austrian defeat at the Battle of Eckmühl, John received orders to retreat in order to cover the strategic left flank of the army in southern Germany.

=== Austrian retreat ===
John fought Eugène in a tough rearguard action at the Battle of Piave River on 8 May. Up to this moment, John and his soldiers had fought well. Now, John probably committed a serious blunder by splitting up his command. With the main army he fell back to the northeast. By the second week of May, John and Feldmarschallleutnant Albert Gyulai stood at Tarvis (Tarvisio) with 8,340 troops. Feldmarschallleutnant Johann Maria Philipp Frimont's 13,060-man Mobile Force lay at nearby Villach. Feldmarschallleutnant Ignác Gyulay with 14,880 men of the IX Armeekorps defended the Laibach (now Ljubljana, Slovenia) area to the southeast of Villach. Far to the west-northwest, Feldmarschallleutnant Johann Gabriel Chasteler de Courcelles and 17,460 soldiers of the VIII Armeekorps held the region around Innsbruck. Feldmarschallleutnant Franjo Jelačić and the 10,200-strong Northern Division was stationed at Salzburg to the northwest. Finally, General-major Andreas von Stoichewich's 8,100 men continued to pin Marmont in Dalmatia to the south of Laibach. By this time a large proportion of John's forces was made up of hastily raised Landwehr infantry.

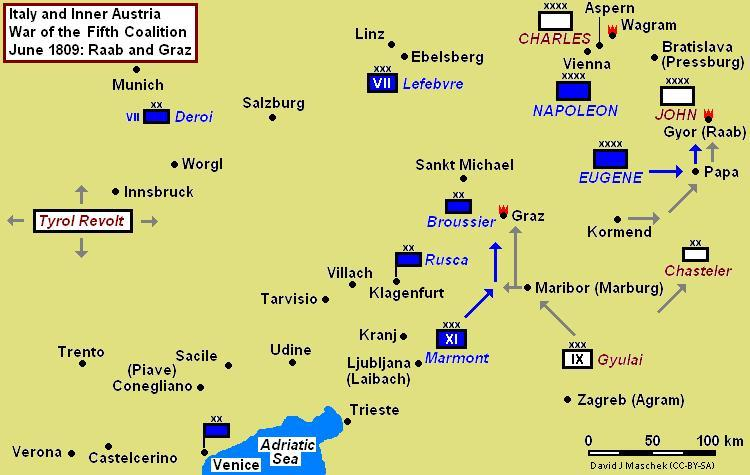
Battles of Raab (14 June) and Graz (24–26 June) campaign map

On 13 May, Marshal François Joseph Lefebvre and a Bavarian army wrecked part of Chasteler's corps at the Battle of Wörgl near Innsbruck. On 17 May, John received orders to cut the communications of Emperor Napoleon's Grand Army by moving north. However, the archduke delayed too long in carrying out this assignment. Though badly isolated, Jelačić remained near Salzburg until 19 May. When he finally got moving it was too late. A French corps under General of Division Paul Grenier cut the Northern Division to pieces at the Battle of Sankt Michael on 25 May. John pulled back to Graz, but when he heard of Jelačić's disaster, he decided to retreat east into Hungary.

During May, small Grenz infantry forces heroically defended the mountain passes during the Battle of Tarvis. At Malborghetto Valbruna, 400 soldiers held a blockhouse against 15,000 Frenchmen between 15 and 17 May and only 50 men survived. The French admitted only 80 casualties. At the Predil Pass blockhouse, 250 Austrians and 8 cannon held off 8,500 French soldiers for three days. On 18 May, when the position was finally overrun, the Grenzers were killed to a man. The French admitted suffering 450 casualties. At Tarvis itself, Eugène inflicted a serious defeat on Albert Gyulai's outnumbered division.

In mid-May, Marmont defeated Stoichewich's forces in the Dalmatian Campaign. He moved north in a fighting advance, arriving at Laibach on 3 June. Marmont then combined with General of Division Jean-Baptiste Broussier and fought Ignác Gyulay's Austrians in the Battle of Graz from 24 to 26 June. His 11,000 XI Corps soldiers, plus Broussier, force-marched to join Napoleon near Vienna and fought at the Battle of Wagram.

John joined with the Hungarian Insurrection forces (militia) at Győr (Raab). He intended to cross to the north bank of the Danube and move northwest through Pozsony (Pressburg, now Bratislava, Slovakia) to unite with the main army, which was commanded by his brother Archduke Charles, Duke of Teschen, Generalissimo of the Austrian armies. Napoleon ordered Eugène to pursue and destroy John's army. The Franco-Italian troops caught up with the Austrians in mid-June and forced John to give battle.

== Battle ==
=== Franco-Italian Army ===
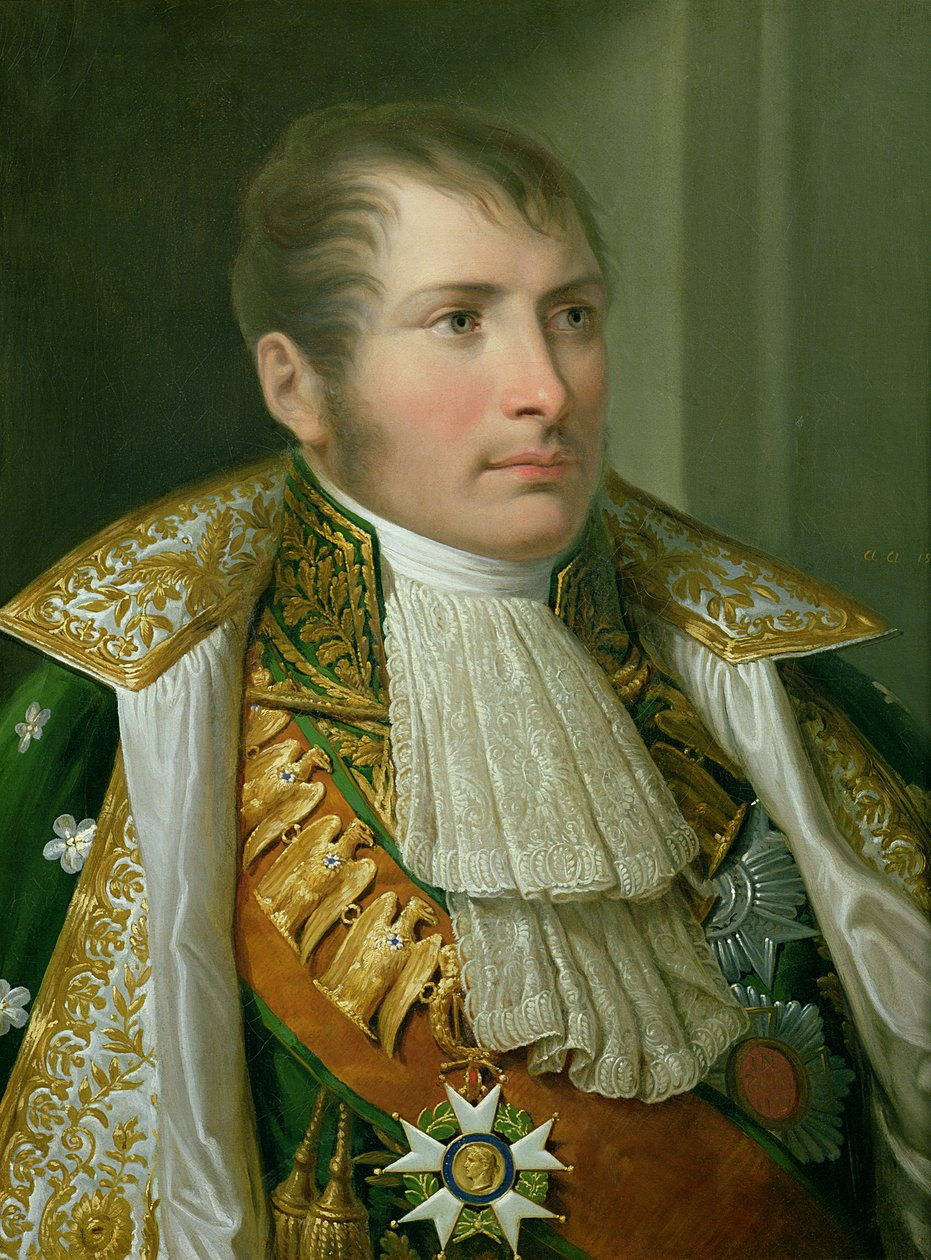
Eugène de Beauharnais

Army of Italy: Prince Eugène de Beauharnais (39,902, 42 guns)

- VI Corps: General of Division Paul Grenier (13,940 infantry, 1,178 cavalry, 12 guns, 544 gunners & sappers)
  - 1st Division: General of Division Jean-Mathieu Seras (6,797 infantry, 707 cavalry, 354 gunners)
  - 2nd Division: General of Division Pierre François Joseph Durutte (7,143 infantry, 471 cavalry, 190 gunners)
- XII Corps: General of Division Louis Baraguey d'Hilliers (7,777 infantry, 259 cavalry, 6 guns, 279 gunners)
  - 2nd Division: General of Division Philippe Eustache Louis Severoli (7,777 infantry, 259 cavalry)
- Cavalry Reserve: General of Division Emmanuel Grouchy (5,371 cavalry, 12 guns)
  - Light Cavalry Division: General of Division Louis Pierre, Count Montbrun (1,516 cavalry, 6 guns)
  - Light Cavalry Division: General of Brigade Pierre David de Colbert-Chabanais (1,771 cavalry, 6 guns)
    - 9th Hussar Regiment, three squadrons
    - 7th Chasseurs à Cheval Regiment, three squadrons
    - 20th Chasseurs à Cheval Regiment, three squadrons
  - Dragoon Division: General of Brigade François Guèrin d'Etoquigny (2,084 cavalry, 6 guns)
- Reserve: Eugène
  - 1st Division: General of Division Michel Marie Pacthod (4,937 infantry, 6 guns, 229 gunners)
  - Light Cavalry Division: General of Division Louis Michel Antoine Sahuc (1,280 cavalry)
  - Dragoon Division: General of Division Charles Joseph Randon de Malboissière de Pully (1,470 cavalry)
  - Italian Guard: General of Division Teodoro Lechi (1,328 infantry, 671 cavalry, 6 guns, 439 gunners)
- Detached:
  - Division: General of Division Jacques Lauriston Epstein identifies the units in Lauriston's division as the Baden brigade and Colbert's cavalry brigade. Colbert was detached to Grouchy's wing.
    - Baden Brigade: Colonel Nevenstein (5,494) Bowden lists this brigade in the Eckmuhl order of battle. Its composition and strength may have changed between April and July.
      - Leib Regiment Grossherzog, two battalions
      - Regiment Erb Grossherzog, two battalions
      - Regiment Hochberg, two battalions
      - Jaeger Battalion Lingg

=== Austro-Hungarian Army ===
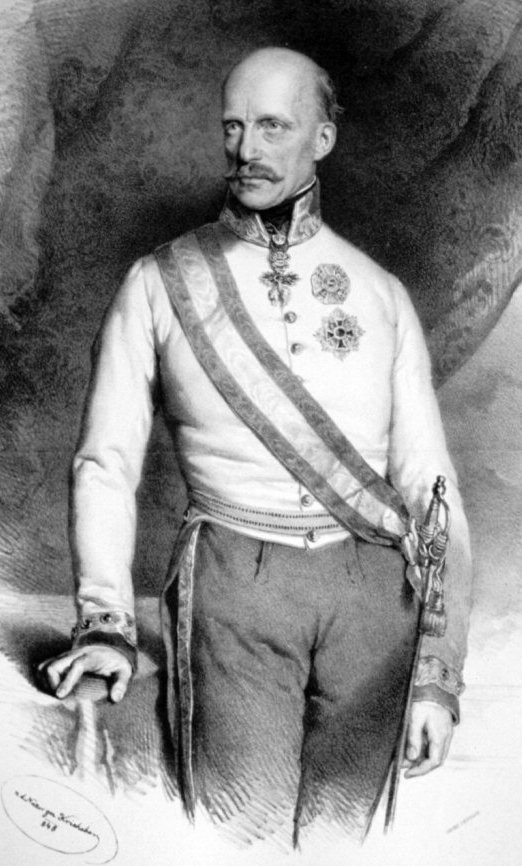
Archduke John

- Army of Inner Austria: General der Kavallerie Archduke John of Austria and Feldmarschall Archduke Joseph, Palatine of Hungary (35,525, 30 guns)
  - Left Flank: Feldmarschall-Leutnant Daniel Mécsery (5,947 cavalry, 3 guns)
    - Hussar Brigade: Oberst Johann Gosztonyi (602 regular and 1,740 insurrections cavalry)
    - Hussar Brigade: General-major Johann Andrássy (739 regular and 1,442 insurrections cavalry)
    - Hussar Brigade: Feldmarscall-Leutnant Andreas Hadik (1,424 insurrections cav)
  - Center: Feldmarscall-Leutnant Hieronymus Colloredo-Mansfeld (7,778 infantry, 6 guns) Colloredo-Mansfeld indicates that Colloredo was promoted to FML only after Raab.
    - Brigade: General-major Franz Marziani (747 regular, 967 landwehr and 1,400 insurrections infantry)
    - Brigade: General-major Peter Lutz (3,186 regular and 1,478 landwehr infantry)
  - Right Flank: Feldmarscall-Leutnant Franjo Jelačić (7,517 infantry, 6 guns)
    - Brigade: General-major Ignaz Legisfeld (1,527 landwehr infantry)
    - Brigade: Oberst Ludwig Eckhardt (1,152 regular and 1,700 insurrections infantry)
    - Brigade: General-major Ignaz Sebottendorf (2,015 regular and 1,123 landwehr infantry)
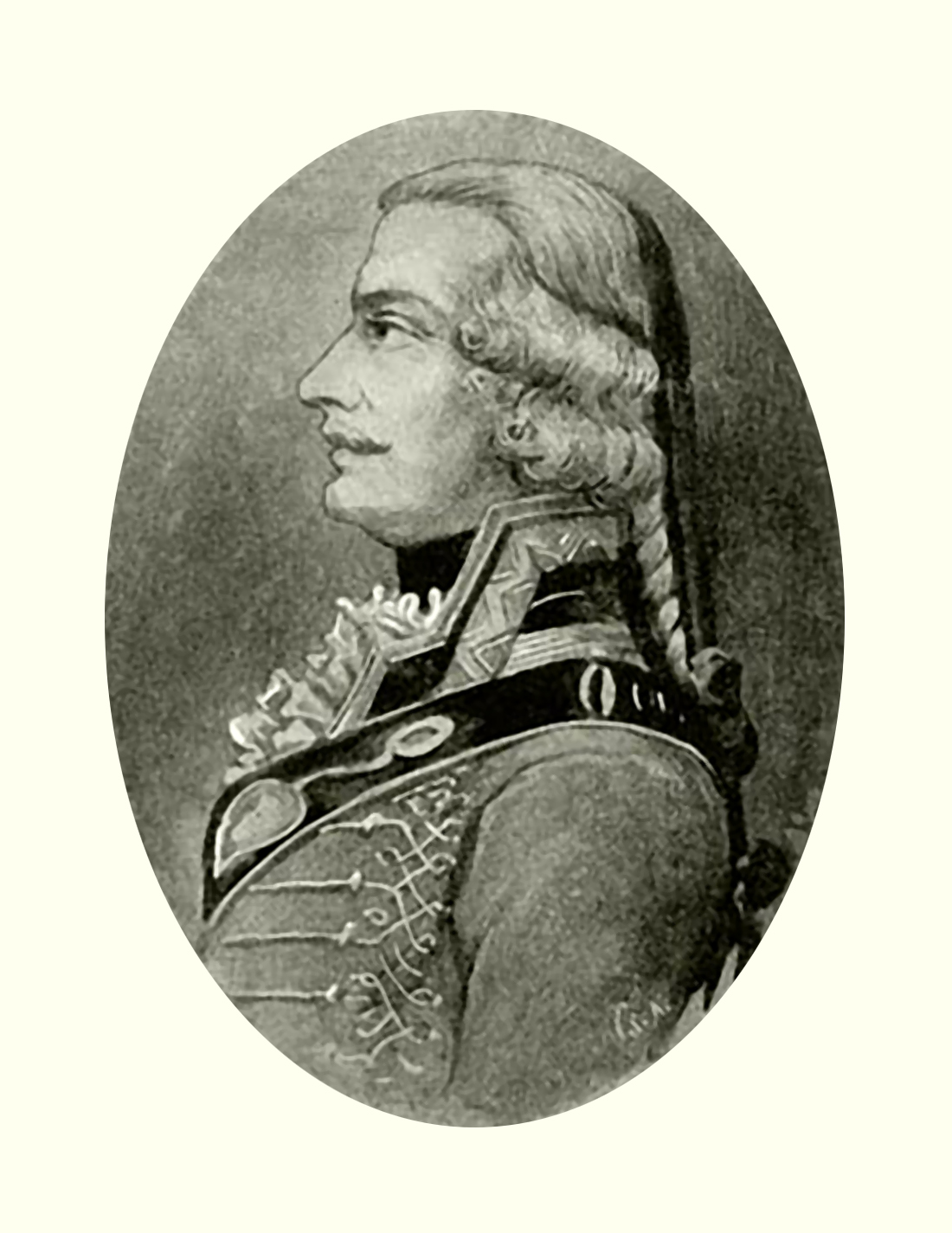
  - Joseph, Baron von Mesko de Felsö-Kubinyi, Hungarian General
    Right Flank Cavalry: (1,546 cavalry)
    - Cavalry Brigade: Oberst Emerich Bésán (885 regular and 661 insurrections cavalry)
  - Reserve: Feldmarscall-Leutnant Johann Frimont (7,863 infantry, 12 guns)
    - Brigade: General-major Anton Gajoli (2,579 regular and 517 landwehr infantry)
    - Brigade: General-major Johann Kleinmeyer (2,505 regular and 1,671 grenadier infantry)
    - Brigade: General-major Konstantin Ettingshausen (591 regular infantry)
  - North of the Raab River: Feldzeugmeister Paul Davidovich (3,980, 3 guns)
    - Brigade: General-major Joseph, Baron von Mesko de Felsö-Kubiny (3,500 insurrections infantry, 480 insurrections cavalry)

=== Plans ===
Though John's 35,000-man army was only a little less numerous than Eugène's 40,000 soldiers, the quality of his soldiers was markedly inferior. Many thousands of the Habsburg troops were poorly trained Austrian landwehr (19,000 men) and Hungarian insurrection militia (16,000 men). The archduke knew this and planned to fight a defensive battle in a strong position. Feldmarschall Archduke Joseph, Palatine of Hungary outranked John and was present on the field, but John exercised effective command of the army.

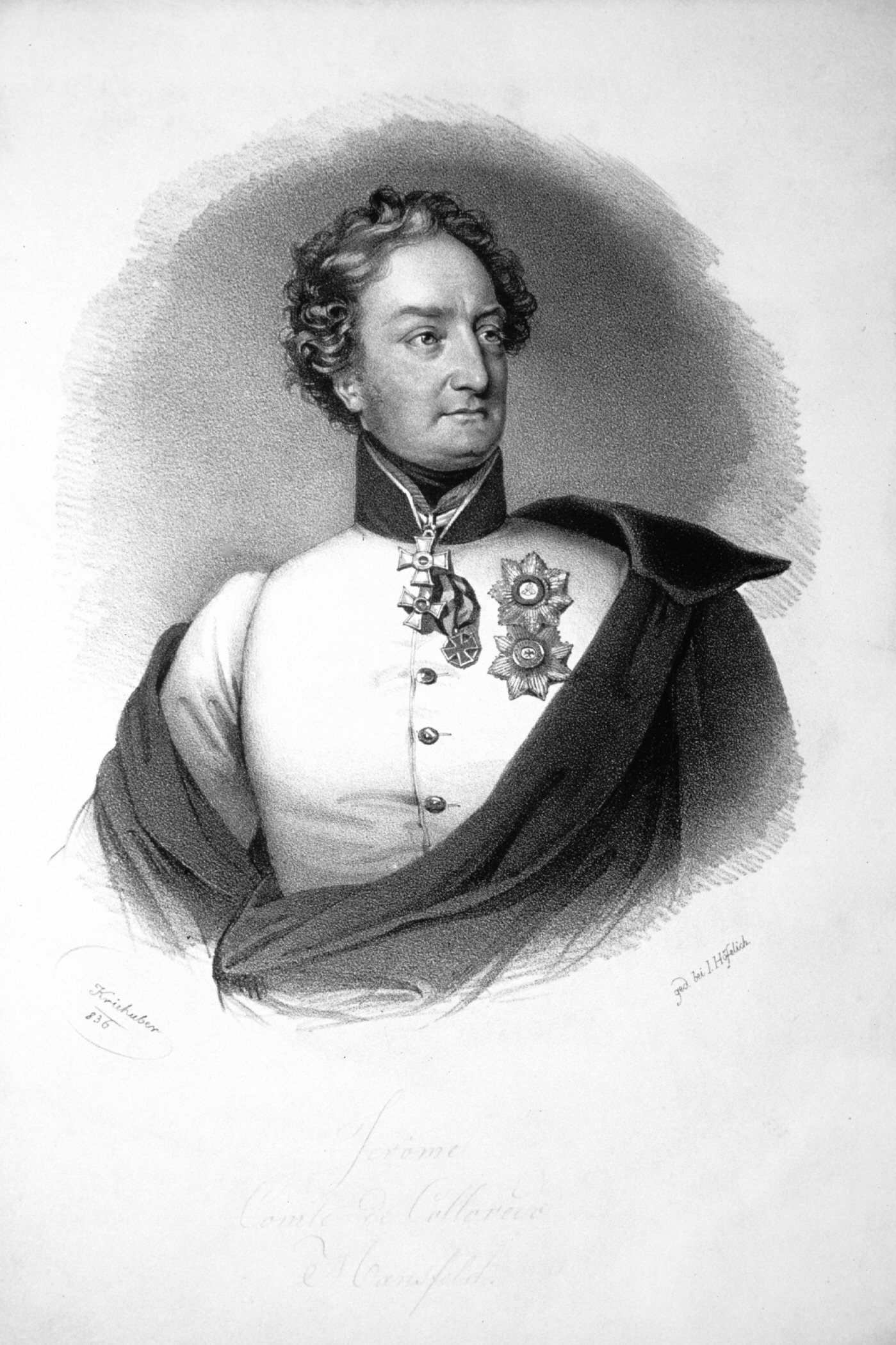
Hieronymus Colloredo held the Austrian center.

John drew up his army behind the Pándzsa stream, facing generally west. The Pándzsa ran roughly from south to north across his front, emptying into the Raab River to the north. In the vicinity of the battlefield, the Raab ran from west to east, protecting John's north flank. The fortress of Győr was on the south side of the river a short distance to the northeast. John hoped the marshy banks of the Páncza to the south would discourage a French envelopment from that direction. The enclosed and stoutly-built Kis-Megyer farm stood on the east bank of the Páncza. Just east of Kis-Megyer farm rose Szabadhegy hill. On the hill's north side lay Szabadhegy hamlet.

John deployed FML Mécsery's 5,947 cavalry to defend his left flank behind the Pándzsa. He turned Kis-Megyer into a major strongpoint by packing FML Colloredo's 7,778 infantry into the farm and its environs. Jelačić's 7,517 soldiers defended the right flank in front of Szabadhegy hamlet. FML Frimont's 7,863-man reserve stood on Szabadhegy hill. Oberst Bésán's 1,546 horsemen held the ground between Jelačić's right and the Raab River. FZM Davidovich held some field works on the north side of the river with about 4,000 Hungarian militia.

Eugène took MG Grouchy from his corps command and reassigned him to command the 5,371 troopers in the cavalry divisions of MG Montbrun, BG Guèrin, and BG Colbert. These were posted on the right (south) flank with the intention of turning John's left flank. Eugène ordered Grenier to assault the Austrian center with the 15,662 men of his two divisions. MG d'Hilliers was instructed to attack the Austrian right with his single division of 8,315 soldiers. Eugène held the troops from Grouchy's corps in reserve, MG Pacthod's 5,166-foot soldiers and MG Sahuc's 1,280 cavalry. He also kept back MG Pully's 1,470 dragoons and MG Lechi's 2,438 Italian Guards.

=== Fighting ===
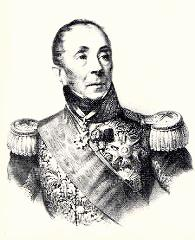
Emmanuel Grouchy's cavalry was key to the French victory.

In the first rush, MG Durutte's troops stormed across the Pándzsa and seized Kis-Megyer farm, but the Austrians quickly took it back. In bitter fighting, the farm changed hands five times. Finally, John committed GM Kleinmeyer's powerful brigade. Four grenadier battalions and the soldiers of the Alvinczi Infantry Regiment # 19 pushed back MG Seras' troops, then fell upon Durutte's division near the farm. Meanwhile, MG Severoli's division pushed back Jelačić and took part of Szabadhegy hamlet. John sent GM Gajoli's brigade from the reserve to deal with this threat. The Austrian counterattack succeeded in panicking the soldiers of Grenier and d'Hilliers. They abandoned their gains and ran back to the west side of the Pándzsa and safety.

Deducing that the three Austrian cannon defended the best crossing point over the Pándzsa, Grouchy ordered up his 12 guns. French cannon fire soon silenced the opposing artillery pieces, allowing Grouchy's horsemen to begin fording the stream. When the French cavalry charged, covered by a cannonade, the Insurrections Hussars soon took flight. Only the Ott Hussar Regiment # 7 and the Archduke Joseph Hussar Regiment # 2 put up serious resistance and both units suffered heavy losses. Grouchy wheeled his troopers to the left to roll up John's left flank.

Faced with a crisis, John redeployed his units in an L-shaped line. His right flank still ran along the Pándzsa, but at Kis-Megyer farm, the line bent to face south along the Szabadhegy hill. John sent Bésán's horsemen from the right flank to cover the new left flank on the east side of Szabadhegy hill. For his second assault, Eugène sent in Pacthod's division and Lechi's Italian Guards from his reserve. The second infantry attack slowly made headway. Finally, the Italian Guard cleared Kis-Megyer farm. John, fearing envelopment from Grouchy's cavalry, ordered a retreat northeast into Győr fortress.

== Results ==
The Franco-Italians suffered 3,000–4,000 killed and wounded. The Austrian regulars and Landwehr lost 747 killed, 1,758 wounded, and 2,408 captured for a total of 4,913 casualties. There were also 1,322 soldiers reported missing, giving a total of 6,235 men subtracted from John's army. The insurrection troops lost in excess of 4,100, of which 80% were missing. Total Austrian losses came to 10,300. John's army retreated northeast to Komárno, leaving a garrison in Győr. The fortress surrendered on 22 June with 2,500 soldiers after a weak resistance.

One historian writes,

Archduke John now reaped the dubious fruits of his incredibly ill-advised policy of breaking up his army after the Battle of Piave River. This defeat foiled any hopes that Archduke John would be able to bring any significant forces to help in the epic struggle against Napoleon at Wagram on 5 and 6 July.

Eugène soon joined Napoleon with 23,000 soldiers. While these men fought at the Battle of Wagram, John was only able to bring 12,000 men to that field and he intervened too late to have any effect.

== See also ==
- Battle of Sacile 16 April 1809
- Battle of Piave River 8 May 1809
- Battle of Wagram 5–6 July 1809
- French Wikipedia List of French Generals 1792-1815

Preceded by Battle of Stralsund (1809)	Napoleonic Wars; Battle of Raab	Succeeded by Battle of María
