= Jean-Mathieu Seras =

French military division commander

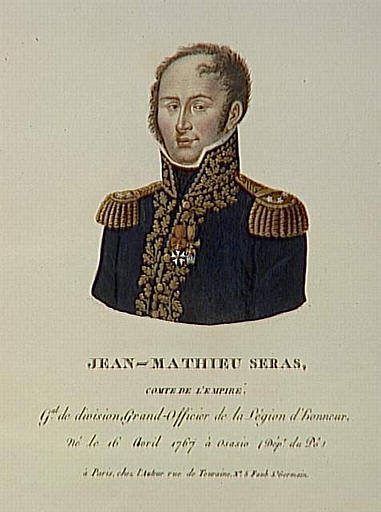
- Jean-Mathieu Seras
- Born: 16 April 1765; Piedmont, in modern-day Italy
- Died: 14 April 1815 (aged 49) Grenoble, France
- Allegiance: France
- Branch: Infantry
- Service years: 1791–1814
- Rank: General of Division
- Conflicts: French Revolutionary Wars; Battle of Novi; Napoleonic Wars; Battle of Sacile; Battle of Piave River; Battle of Sankt Michael; Battle of Raab; Battle of Wagram
- Awards: Légion d'Honneur, GC, 1809
- Other work: Count of the Empire, 1809

Jean-Mathieu Seras or Serras (French pronunciation: [ʒɑ̃ matjø səʁɑ / sɛʁɑ]; 16 April 1765 – 14 April 1815) was born in northwest Italy, but adhered to the French Revolution and joined the French army. He became a division commander in the First French Empire under Napoleon and led troops in Italy and Spain. Seras is one of the names inscribed on the Arc de Triomphe on Column 25.

== Italy 1799 ==
Seras led a brigade in Louis Lemoine's division at the Battle of Novi on 15 August 1799. His brigade included two battalions each of the 20th and 34th Line Infantry Demi-Brigades and 3 squadrons of the 1st Hussar Regiment. In this sanguinary combat, the French suffered losses of 1,500 killed, 5,500 wounded, and 4,500 captured, along with 37 cannons and eight colors. The victorious Austro-Russian army lost 900 killed and 4,200 wounded, plus three guns and 1,400 men captured.

== Spain 1810 ==
Seras was sent to Spain with a new 8,000-man division from France in spring 1810. The division consisted of the French 113th Line Infantry Regiment, two battalions of the Polish 4th Vistula Legion, the 4th Battalions of the French 12th Light, 32nd Line, and 58th Line Infantry Regiments, and four provisional battalions. Though the unit was nominally French, the 113th Line was recruited from Italians when the Grand Duchy of Tuscany was annexed to the French Empire. Seras joined François Étienne de Kellermann's command in the Province of León.

== Italy 1813 ==
When Eugène de Beauharnais reorganized the Army of Italy in the summer of 1813, Seras was appointed to command the Reserve Division. In August, the division consisted of three brigades and one battery of 6-pound field pieces. The 1st Brigade was made up of one battalion of the 14th French Light Infantry Regiment, two battalions of the 4th Provisional Croatian Regiment, and four battalions of the 1st Foreign Regiment. The 2nd Brigade comprised two battalions of the 2nd Foreign Regiment and one battalion each of the 6th French Line, 2nd Italian Light, 1st Italian Line, and 6th Italian Line. The 3rd Brigade had one battalion each of the 35th and 36th French Light, and the 131st, 132nd, and 133rd French Line.

Seras was named governor of Venice in late 1813. He reported that he used French troops to repair the field works and make counterattacks because his Italian soldiers were prone to desertion as soon as they got outside the fortifications. Venice's powerful garrison was allotted enough provisions and supplies to hold out for six months. There were four zones of defense under Generals of Brigade René Joseph Dupeyroux, Dupérè, Jean Jacques Schilt, and Charles Daurier. Dupeyroux held the coast from the Adige to the Malamocco River, Dupérè defended the mouth of the Malamocco and several nearby villages, Daurier was responsible for the Venice itself, and Schilt patrolled the city's outskirts.
