= Battle of Sankt Michael =

1809 battle during the War of the Fifth Coalition

- Part of the Napoleonic Wars
Date	25 May 1809
Location	Sankt Michael in Obersteiermark, Austria 47°20′19″N 15°01′06″E
Result	French victory

Belligerents
(France) First French Empire	Austrian Empire

Commanders and leaders
(France) Paul Grenier	(Austrian Empire) Franz Jellacic

Strength
12,000 to 15,000	8,000 to 9,000

Casualties and losses
670	6,573

War of the Fifth Coalition
current battle
Napoleon in command
Napoleon not in command

In the Battle of Sankt Michael (or Sankt Michael-Leoben) on 25 May 1809, Paul Grenier's French corps crushed Franz Jellacic's Austrian division at Sankt Michael in Obersteiermark, Austria. The action occurred after the initial French victories during the War of the Fifth Coalition, part of the Napoleonic Wars. Sankt Michael is located approximately 140 kilometres (87 mi) southwest of Vienna.

Originally part of the Danube army of Archduke Charles, Jellacic's division was detached to the south before the Battle of Eckmühl and later ordered to join the army of Archduke John at Graz. As it retreated southeast toward Graz, Jellacic's division passed across the front of Eugène de Beauharnais' Army of Italy, which was advancing northeast in pursuit of Archduke John. When he learned of Jellacic's presence, Eugène sent Grenier with two divisions to intercept the Austrian column.

Grenier's lead division duly intercepted Jellacic's force and attacked. Though the Austrians were able to hold off the French at first, they were unable to get away. The second French division's arrival secured a clear numerical superiority over Jellacic, who was critically short of cavalry (only 60 horsemen) and artillery (one half-battery against two Grenier's batteries), and also had a poorly trained Landwehr with a total number of up to 2,880. Grenier's subsequent French assault broke the Austrian lines and captured thousands of prisoners. When Jellacic joined John it was with only a fraction of his original force.

== Background ==
In the opening encounters of the 1809 war between France and Austria, Emperor Napoleon beat Feldmarschall-Leutnant Johann von Hiller at the battles of Abensberg and Landshut on 20 and 21 April. The following day, Napoleon defeated Generalissimo Archduke Charles at the Battle of Eckmühl, forcing him to retreat through Regensberg (Ratisbon) to the Danube's north bank with the main army. On the south bank, Hiller fell back to the east with his own VI Armeekorps, Feldmarschall-Leutnant Archduke Louis' V Armeekorps, and Feldmarschall-Leutnant Michael von Kienmayer's II Reserve Armeekorps, pursued by Marshal André Masséna.

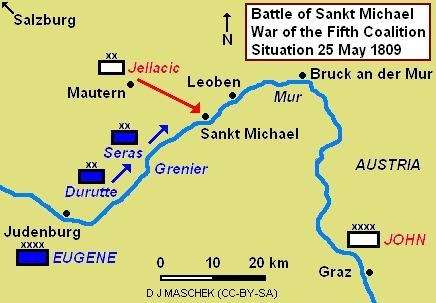
Battle of Sankt Michael, situation early 25 May 1809

At the beginning of the 1809 war, Feldmarschall-Leutnant Jellacic's division formed part of VI Armeekorps and consisted of two brigades of line infantry under Generals-Major Konstantin Ettingshausen and Josef Hoffmeister von Hoffeneck. However, when Bavaria was invaded, Archduke Charles detached Jellacic to advance from Salzburg and occupy Munich on the extreme south flank. To better perform this mission, Hoffmeister's brigade was exchanged for General-Major Karl Dollmayer von Provenchères' cavalry-infantry brigade from the corps light division. After the Austrian retreat began, Jellacic was ordered to fall back on Salzburg. Accordingly, elements of his command began assembling in Salzburg beginning on 29 April. Believing cavalry was of little use in the mountains, Jellacic sent Provenchères toward Vienna on 1 May with the O'Reilly Chevauxlegers # 3. Hiller fought the Battle of Ebersberg on 3 May, then crossed to the north bank of the Danube on 11 May. On 4 and 5 May, Jellacic fought a successful rearguard action at Lueg Pass, 40 km (25 mi) south of Salzburg. In the clash, a few hundred Hungarian regulars and Grenz infantry repulsed a brigade of pursuing Bavarians under the overall command of Marshal François Joseph Lefebvre.

In Italy, General of Cavalry Archduke John defeated Viceroy Eugène at the Battle of Sacile on 16 April. Eugène fell back to Verona where he gathered reinforcements until he was superior in numbers to his Austrian opponent. After hearing news that Archduke Charles was in retreat, John withdrew from his Adige River defenses on 1 May.

On 8 May, Eugène and John fought the Battle of Piave River and the Austrian retreat continued. John split his army, sending Feldmarschall-Leutnant Ignaz Gyulai along a southerly route to Ljubljana (Laybach), while taking his attenuated main body northeast to Villach. Sending General of Division Jacques MacDonald and 20,000 soldiers after Gyulai, Eugène followed John with 25,000 troops. As John's columns slipped away toward Klagenfurt and Graz, Eugene entered Villach on 20 May.

On 15 May, Jellacic held Salzburg with 10,200 troops and 16 artillery pieces of the Northern Division. His force included 2,880 poorly trained Landwehr and only 60 cavalrymen. After receiving orders from Archduke John to join him at Graz, Jellacic evacuated Salzburg on 19 May. By this time his isolation had become dangerous. Eugène at Villach was only 130 km (81 mi) from Graz, while Jellacic at Salzburg was 200 km (120 mi) distant from Graz. (Note: Airline distances measured from Google Earth.)

== Battle ==
=== French order of battle ===
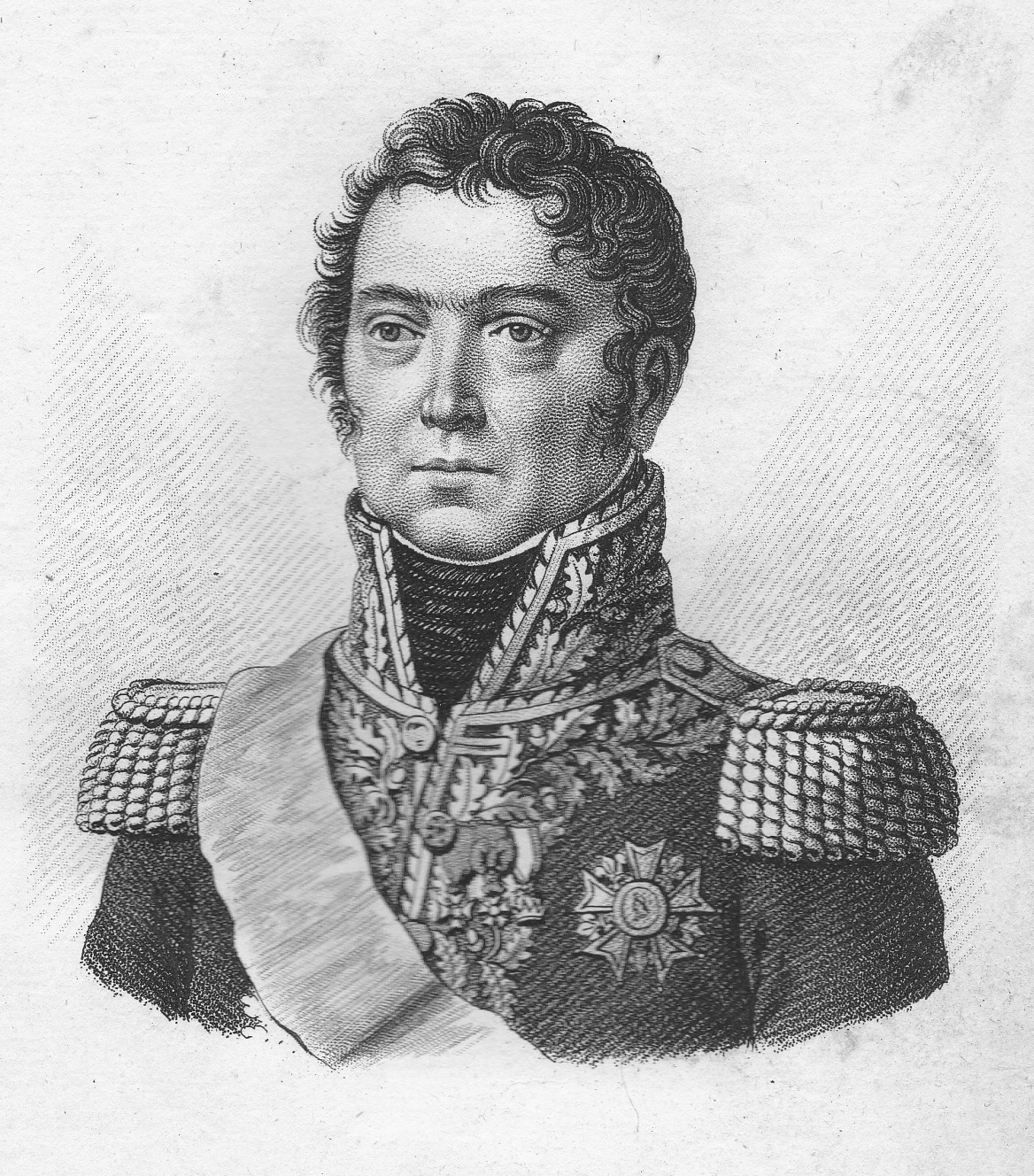
Paul Grenier

- Corps: General of Division Paul Grenier
  - Artillery: One 6-pdr foot battery, one 4-pound horse battery. This source shows Durutte's division had a 6-pdr foot battery at Piave. In Eugene's army all horse batteries had 4-pound guns.
  - Division: General of Division Pierre François Joseph Durutte
    - Brigade: General of Brigade François Valentin
      - 22nd Light Infantry Regiment (two battalions), 23rd Light Infantry Regiment (four battalions)
    - Brigade: General of Brigade Joseph Marie, Count Dessaix
      - 62nd Line Infantry Regiment (four battalions), 102nd Line Infantry Regiment (three battalions)
    - Attached: 6th Chasseurs à cheval Regiment (four squadrons)
  - Division: General of Division Jean-Mathieu Seras
    - Brigade: General of Brigade Roussel (Note: French Wikipedia, fr:Liste des généraux de la Révolution et du Premier Empire. This is either Jean Charles Roussel or Charles Alexandre Roussel de Saint-Rémy.)
      - 1st Light Infantry Regiment (one battalion), 53rd Line Infantry Regiment (four battalions)
    - Brigade: General of Brigade Louis Gareau Schneid's order of battle omits Gareau. (Note: French Wikipedia, fr:Louis Gareau)
      - 35th Line Infantry Regiment (one battalion), 42nd Line Infantry Regiment (one battalion), 106th Line Infantry Regiment (four battalions)
    - Attached: 9th Chasseurs à Cheval Regiment (four squadrons)

=== Austrian order of battle ===
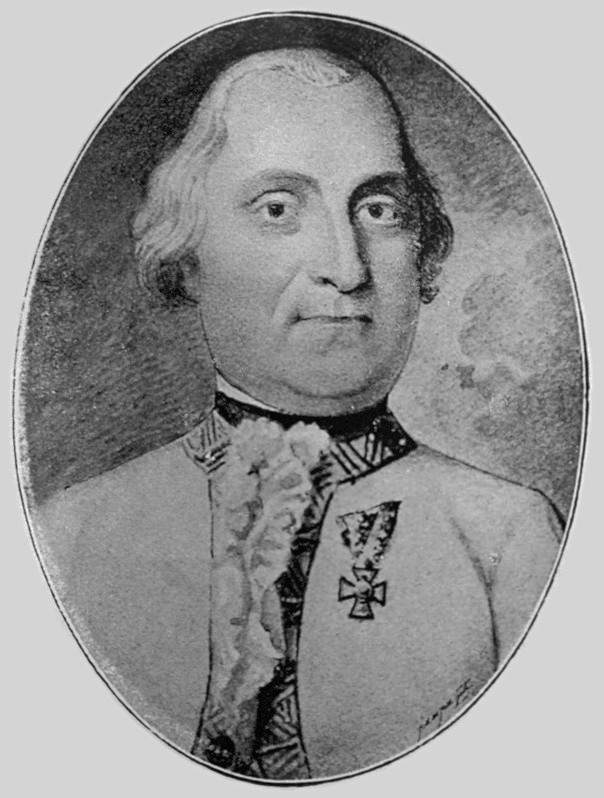
Franz Jellacic

- Northern Division: Feldmarschall-Leutnant Franz Jellacic
  - Brigade: General-Major Konstantin Ettingshausen
    - Esterhazy IR # 32 (3 bns, 2,700)
    - De Vaux IR # 45 (2 bns, 2,160)
  - Brigade: General-Major Ignaz Legisfeld
    - Warasdiner-Kreutzer Grenz IR # 5 (2 bns, 2,160)
    - Reuss-Greiz IR # 55 (1 bn)
    - Archduke Charles IR # 3 (½ bn)
  - Attached:
    - Salzburger Landwehr (1 bn, 720)
    - O'Reilly Chevaulegers # 3 (1 sqn, 60 troopers)
    - 3-pdr brigade half-battery (4 cannons)

=== Key ===
- bn, bns = Infantry battalion, battalions
- sqn, sqns = Cavalry squadron, squadrons
- IR = Infantry Regiment
- 3-pdr = Three-pounders were light cannons
- 4-pdr = Four-pounders were light cannons. French batteries included two 6-pouce (inch) howitzers.
- 6-pdr = Six-pounders were medium cannons. French batteries included two 6-inch howitzers.

=== Action ===
On the evening of 23 May, Jellacic's column marched into Mautern in Steiermark, 16 km (9.9 mi) northwest of Sankt Michael on the Mur River and 60 km (37 mi) northwest of Archduke John at Graz. At the same time, Eugène's main body reached Judenburg on the Mur, 33 km (21 mi) southwest of Sankt Michael, with elements only 20 km (12 mi) away. For his part, Archduke John warned Jellacic that Eugene was heading for Bruck an der Mur, 40 km (25 mi) north of Graz. The axes of advance for both Eugene and Jellacic intersected at Sankt Michael. At about this time, Eugene became aware of Jellacic's presence and ordered General of Division Grenier to force-march the two nearest divisions, those of Generals of Division Jean-Mathieu Seras and Pierre François Joseph Durutte, to the northeast and intercept the Austrians. At some point, Jellacic sent away the bulk of the Salzburger Landwehr and most of his artillery, retaining only four cannons.

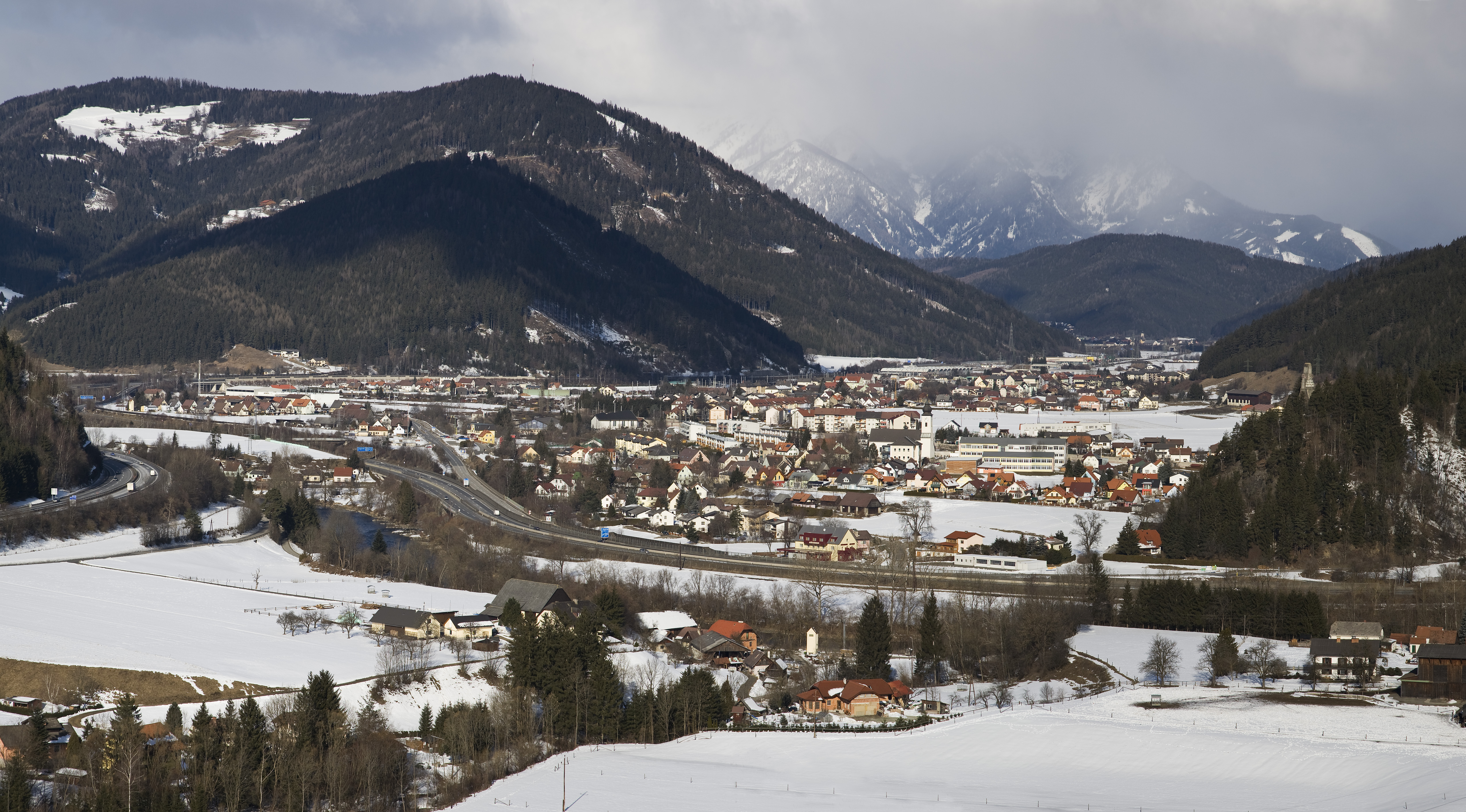
Sankt Michael in Obersteiermark from the south

Jellacic's advance guard arrived at Sankt Michael on the morning of 25 May, and by 9:00 am the bulk of his division had reached a location just to the north. However, Grenier's advance elements soon appeared to the southwest. Jellacic sent his 60 horsemen and General-Major Ignaz Legisfeld's light brigade to hold off the French on a ridge just west of the town. At 10:00 am, Seras attacked Legisfeld's line but his troops were driven back. Seras kept up the pressure and soon the Austrian division commander brought Ettingshausen's brigade of approximately 5,000 soldiers into action. Jellacic anchored his left flank on the Mur and planted his right flank in the hills to the north. Durutte's division arrived in the afternoon, giving Grenier a superiority of about 15,000 to 8,000. Another authority gives the French numerical advantage as 12,000 to 9,000 troops.

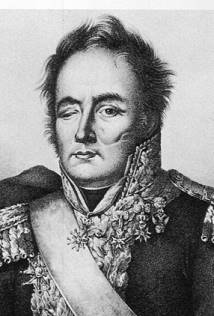
Pierre Durutte

Grenier prepared a two-division assault. He placed General of Brigade Louis Gareau's brigade of Seras in the first line. General of Brigade François Valentin of Durutte's division stood in the second line. Seras' second brigade under General of Brigade Roussel was sent through the hills to envelop Jellacic's right flank and cut the road leading back to Mautern. Durutte's remaining brigade, led by General of Brigade Joseph Marie, Count Dessaix, was held in reserve by Grenier. The French commander also sent two battalions of the 62nd Line Infantry Regiment along the south bank of the Mur to turn the Austrian left flank.

With only one landwehr and one Grenzer battalion to face Roussel's envelopment, Jellacic withdrew one battalion of the Esterhazy Infantry Regiment # 32 from the center to shore up his right flank. Other troops had to be sent to face the threat from the 62nd Line. At 4:00 pm, Grenier's assault smashed the weakened Austrian center. Roussel also broke through on the flank to cut the road to the north. The Austrian fled in rout to the northeast along the Mur valley, closely pursued by the French. Grenier harried his beaten foes through Leoben, 7 km (4.3 mi) northeast, and Bruck an der Mur, 20 km (12 mi) northeast. At Bruck, Jellacic's survivors turned south, following the Mur valley to Graz. Only 2,000 of Jellacic's troops reached Graz the next day.

== Result ==
Grenier wrecked the Northern Division. Instead of providing a substantial reinforcement to Archduke John, Jellacic brought in less than one-third of his command. The Austrians suffered 423 dead, 1,137 wounded, 4,963 captured, and 50 missing. French losses numbered 200 killed, 400 wounded, and 70 captured. Historian Digby Smith blames the disaster on Jellacic remaining in Salzburg too long and his error in sending away most of his cavalry and artillery. Austrian army historian Gunther E. Rothenberg calls Jellacic, "a remarkably unlucky and inept general." Archduke John retreated first to Körmend then to Győr, pursued by Eugène. The main French and Austrian armies fought the Battle of Raab on 14 June.

== Notes ==
Preceded by Battle of Alcañiz	Napoleonic Wars; Battle of Sankt Michael	Succeeded by Battle of Stralsund (1809)
