= Siege of Metz (1814) =

1814 siege during the War of the Sixth Coalition

- Part of the War of the Sixth Coalition
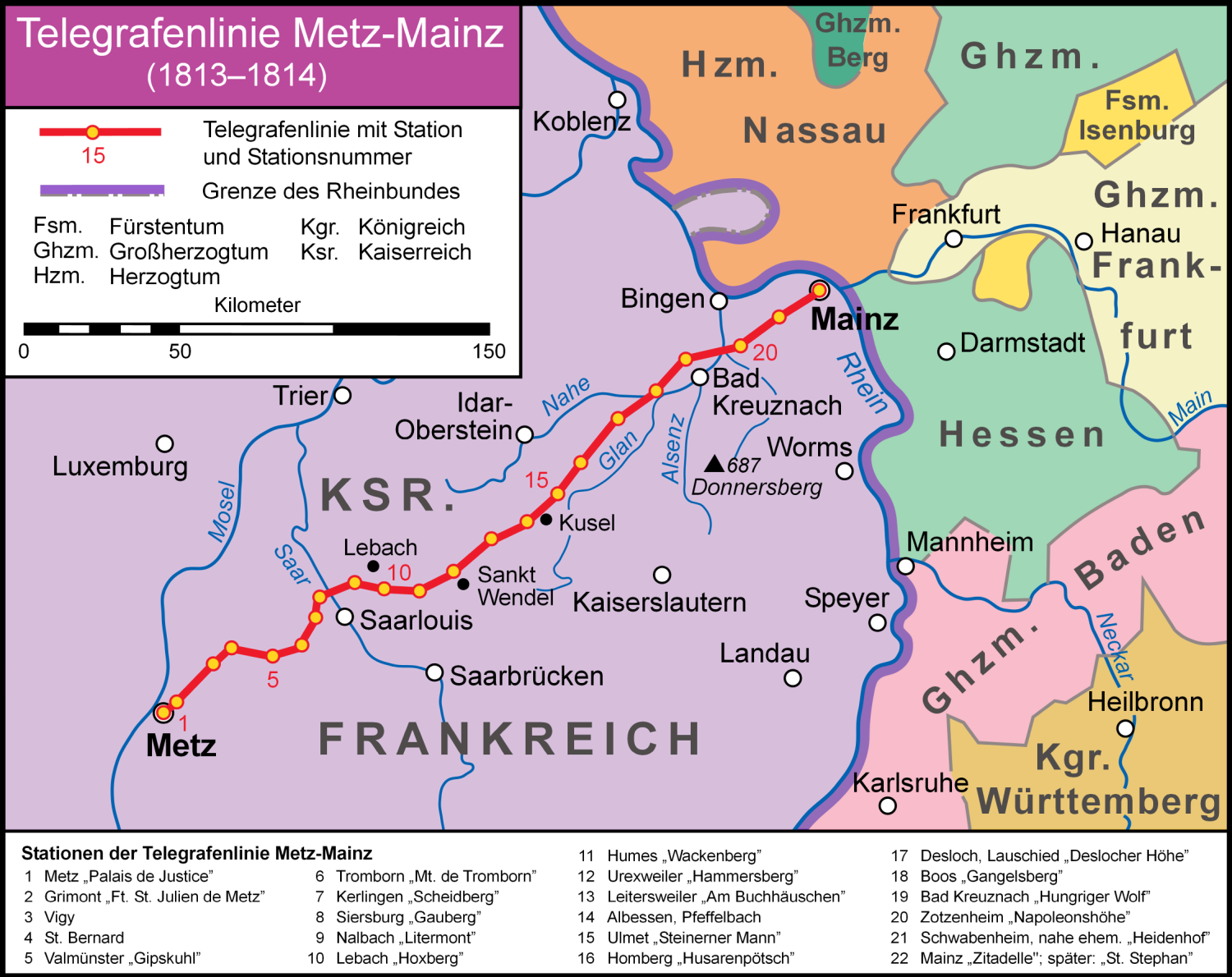
- The optical telegraph line Metz–Mainz 1813–1814
Date	13 January – 10 April 1814
Location	Metz, French Empire 49°07′13″N 06°10′40″E
Result	French victory

Belligerents
(First French Empire) French Empire	(Kingdom of Prussia) Prussia; Russian Empire; Electorate of Hesse

Commanders and leaders
(First French Empire) Pierre Durutte	(Kingdom of Prussia) Prince Wilhelm (Russian Empire) Nikolay Borozdin (Russian Empire) Dimitri Youzefovitch (Hesse) Moritz von Müller

Strength
12,700	Unknown
- Location within France

The siege of Metz (17 January – 10 April 1814) was a blockade of the French city of Metz during the War of the Sixth Coalition at the end of the Napoleonic Wars. It pitted French forces under General of Division (GD) Pierre François Joseph Durutte against Prussian soldiers under Prince Wilhelm of Prussia, Russian cavalry under Nikolay Borozdin, Russian troops under Dimitri Mikhailovich Youzefovitch, and Hessian soldiers under von Müller. The Allied forces began the siege on 17 January 1814 and eventually lifted it on 10 April the same year, without having taken the city. At the end of March and early April, Durutte carried out a remarkable campaign in which he briefly drove away the blockading forces of several nearby fortresses.

== Background ==
After being decisively beaten by the Coalition armies at the Battle of Leipzig on 16–19 October 1813, Emperor Napoleon retreated to France with the 60,000–70,000 survivors of his army. Of the 100,000 French soldiers manning the defenses of German fortresses, none would be able to defend France in the 1814 campaign. The Coalition planned to invade France with three major forces. The Army of Bohemia under Field Marshal Karl Philipp, Prince of Schwarzenberg would cross the upper Rhine River near Basel. One Prussian and one Russian corps from the North Army would invade the Netherlands. The Army of Silesia under Field Marshal Gebhard Leberecht von Blücher would cross the middle Rhine near Mainz. The Army of Bohemia crossed the Rhine on 20 December 1813 while the Army of Silesia crossed the Rhine on 1 January 1814. Napoleon's weakened forces offered little resistance at first. On 11 January, a 40-man Prussian cavalry patrol attacked a French convoy near Metz. By 13 January, Prussian cavalry invested Metz on the east bank of the Moselle River.

On 15 January 1814, Blücher ordered the Prussian I Corps under General Ludwig Yorck von Wartenburg to invest the fortresses of Metz, Saarlouis, Luxembourg City, and Thionville. He hoped that at least one of the places could be used as a base of operations after being captured by storm or negotiation. Blücher noted that the loss of 1,000 men was an acceptable price to pay to seize one of the fortresses. Yorck was authorized to bombard a fortress into submission but not to use up too much ammunition. Blücher wanted Generalmajor Prince Wilhelm's 8th Brigade, supported by Oberst Friedrich Wilhelm von Warburg's 2nd Brigade, to invest Metz. Other units from I Corps would be responsible for investing the other places. Privately, Yorck thought the orders were unreasonable and they made him furious, though he reluctantly tried to carry them out.

== Siege operations ==
Metz was protected by a first-class fortress. Fort Belle Croix overlooked the highway to Saarlouis on the east bank of the Moselle River. Most of the city, with its 40,000 inhabitants, stood on the east bank. The bridge to the west bank was protected by fortifications. Because of flooding on the Moselle, Prince William's 8th Brigade began crossing the river at Pont-à-Mousson, south of Metz, on 18 January. His advance guard marched north and was able to invest Metz from the west bank on 20 January. The bulk of the 8th Brigade did not arrive until 22 January. The following day, a strong French sortie from Metz recaptured Lorry-lès-Metz on the west bank. Meanwhile, Warburg's 2nd Brigade invested the fortress from the east bank. Meanwhile, Prussian and Russian reinforcements began arriving near Metz. The only notable casualty was a Prussian cavalry officer whose head was taken off by a French cannon ball. The Allies estimated that Metz contained a garrison of 5,000 line infantry, 3,000 National Guards, and 200 cavalrymen. In fact, Durutte commanded a garrison of 12,700 soldiers. The French force included five cohorts of National Guards.

On 25 January, Yorck received orders from Blücher for the I Corps to march west toward Bar-le-Duc and Vitry-le-François. Blücher intended to use the I Corps for field operations and not for a siege. Generalmajor Nikolay Borozdin was ordered to maintain the blockade of Metz with his 1,600 cavalrymen. Borozdin's 1st Dragoon Division stayed at Metz until at least 6 February 1814. The 1st Dragoon Division comprised the Mitau, New Russia, Kargopol, and Moscow Dragoon Regiments. Borozdin's horsemen were relieved of this duty by Russian soldiers under Generalmajor Dimitri Youzefovitch. On 24 March, Youzefovitch's troops were replaced by Brigadier General von Müller's Kur-Hessian Brigade. Müller's brigade consisted of 7,750 Hessian soldiers in the Kürfurst and Kürprinz Infantry Regiments, the 2nd Lossberg Grenadier Battalion, two battalions of the 3rd Landwehr Regiment, the Leib Dragoon and Hussar Regiments, the 3rd Volunteer Mounted Jäger Squadron, and the Holzapfel Battery.

== Durutte's campaign ==
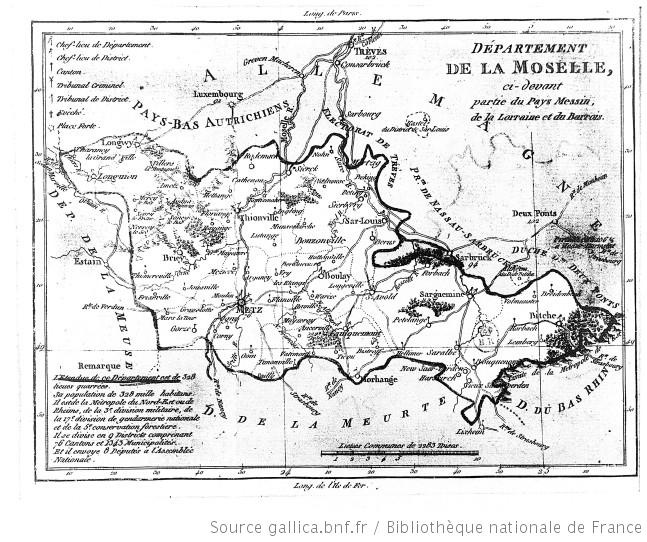
Moselle department map shows locations of Metz, Saarlouis, Thionville, Luxembourg, and Longwy.

On 5 March 1814, Napoleon ordered GD Jan Willem Janssens at Mézières to collect the garrisons of the Ardennes and attack the rear of Blücher's army near Laon. At the same time, Napoleon instructed Durutte to break out of Metz and gather up the garrisons of the nearest fortresses. Janssens was able to join Napoleon's field army with 3,600 men. Napoleon hoped to disrupt the movement of Coalition baggage trains from their base at Nancy. After the Battle of Arcis-sur-Aube on 20–21 March, Napoleon ordered Durutte to form most of the nearby garrisons into a division and either join the field army or operate against the flank of the Coalition army.

General of Brigade (GB) Joseph Léopold Sigisbert Hugo commanded the 1,500-man French garrison of Thionville. In February, Müller blockaded the place with 3,387 Hessian soldiers. Starting on 16 March, both Hugo and Durutte launched probes against the blockading forces near Thionville. Durutte sent three battalions and some cavalry north as far as Illange and Hugo sent 650 men toward Saarlouis. On 22 March, Oberst von Haynau assumed command of the Thionville blockade, replacing Müller who transferred from Thionville to command the Metz blockade.

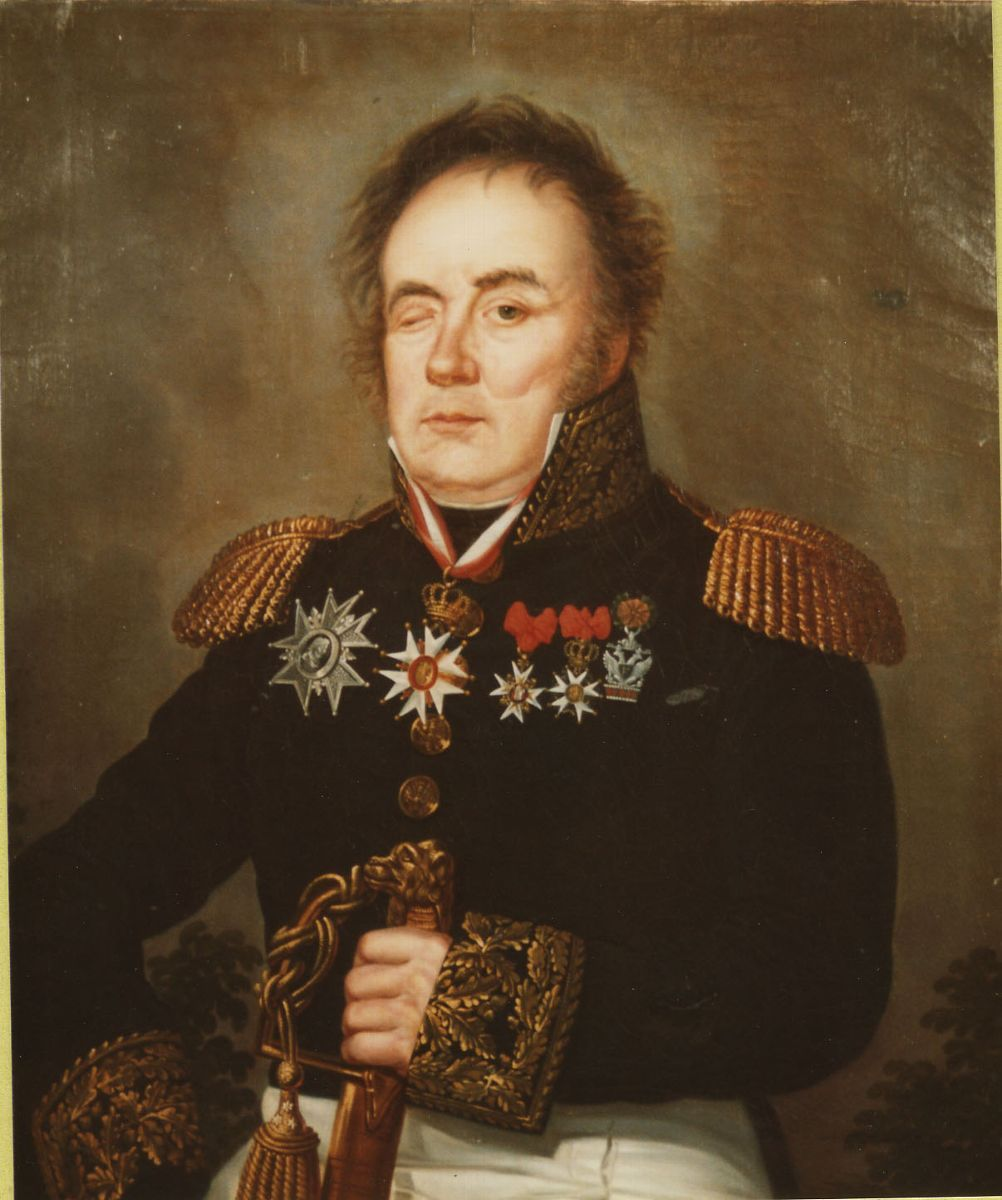
Pierre Durutte, showing the injury to his eye that he received at Waterloo.

At 5:00 am on 24 March 1814, Durutte left Metz with 6 horse artillery pieces, 14–18 field guns, and 8,000 soldiers, marching toward Saarlouis via Bouzonville. Major von Bieberstein commanded the 1,018 Prussians and Hessians blockading Saarlouis. Learning of Durutte's advance, Bieberstein withdrew his forces to Saarbrücken while keeping the French column under observation by cavalry patrols. After reaching Saarlouis on 26 March, Durutte's column turned toward Thionville. On 27 March, Durutte advanced on the Thionville blockading force in three columns led by GB Jean Ernest Beurmann, GB Jacques Guerin, and Major Hubert. The west bank assault drove the 1st Hessian Grenadier Battalion off of high ground near Guentrange, killing 10 Hessians and capturing 50 more. The Hessians fell back from Terville and Manom toward the north in a phased withdrawal.

After relieving Thionville, Durutte added some of its garrison into his column and marched toward Luxembourg. The Hessian force next made a stand at Hettange-Grande but after two hours it was compelled to withdraw after French pressure on its left flank. Durutte's force pressed the Hessians back to Roussy-le-Village where they were reinforced by two battalions, a half-battery, and a squadron of cavalry from Generalmajor Prince Solms-Braunfels' Hessian brigade at Luxembourg. Nevertheless, the French drove their adversaries back to Basse-Rentgen, and then farther north through Aspelt, Syren, and Contern. On 28 March at 9:00 am, the Hessians, now led by General von Dörenberg attempted a final stand near Sandweiler. After a struggle from 1:00–4:00 pm, the Hessians retreated after sustaining a loss of 8 dead, 39 wounded, and 13 missing. Durutte's column marched into Luxembourg City that evening.

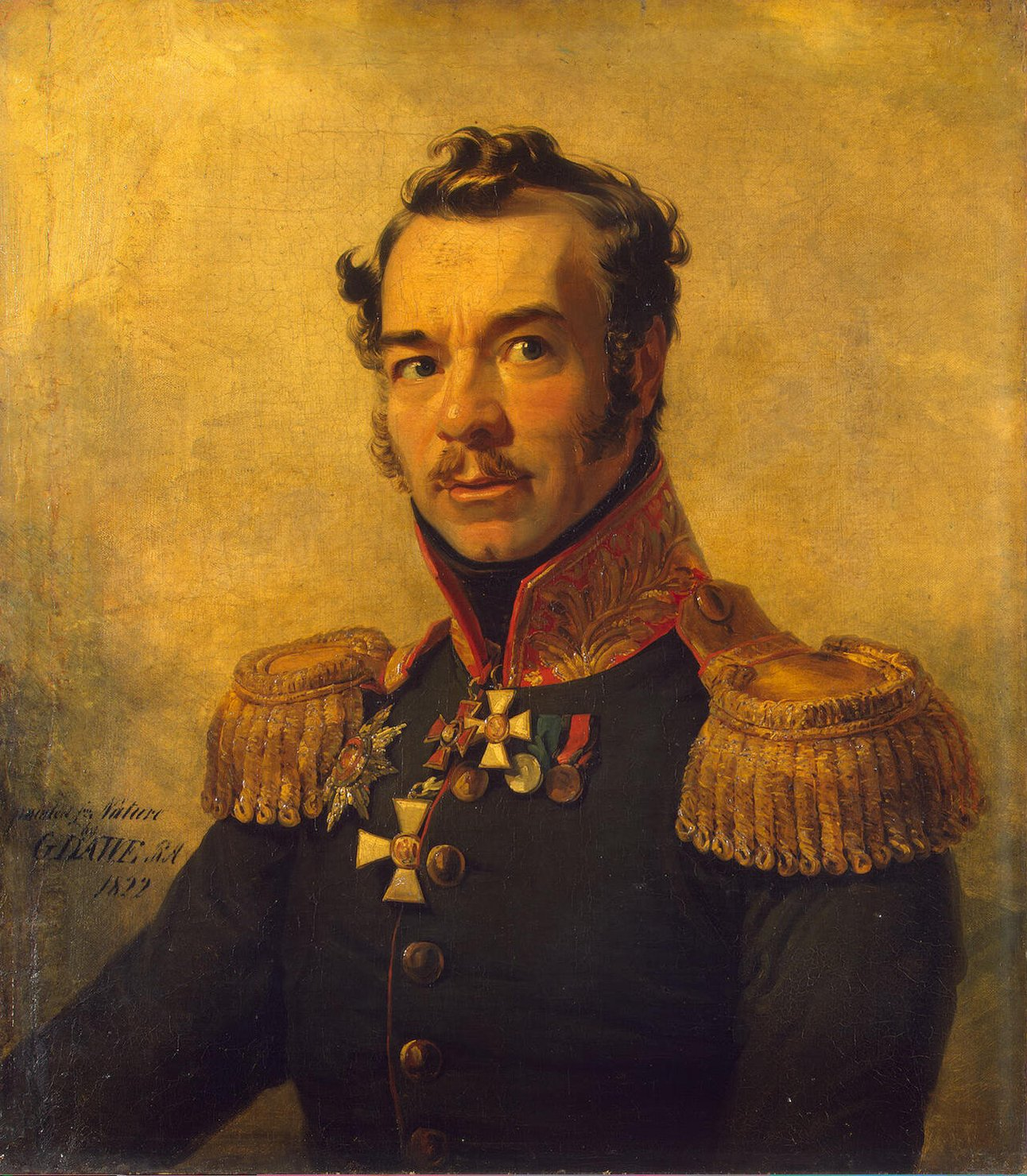
Dimitri Youzefovitch

After adding part of Luxembourg's garrison to his force, Durutte marched southwest toward Longwy. The Hessians resumed their blockade of Thionville. By 30 March, the Hessians lost contact with Durutte's column. After hearing on 3 April that the French were at Longuyon, Müller organized his troops to intercept Durutte's march. Müller's Hessians occupied Woippy, Lorry-lès-Metz, and Moulins-lès-Metz, all on the west bank of the Moselle near Metz. On 4 April, Durutte's column reappeared and drove away the Hessian force, inflicting a loss of 7 dead, 25 wounded, and 182 captured. Generalmajor Prince Biron of Courland commanded a force of Russians and Prussians that numbered 4,720 infantry, 742 cavalry, and 12 guns. Courland's task was to observe the French garrisons of Longwy and Verdun. On 27 March, he drove a 3,000-man French column back into Verdun. Finding that Durutte with 12,000 soldiers and 39 guns was bearing down on his outnumbered force, Courland retreated to Bar-le-Duc, then he marched to Nancy.

On 3 April, Courland and Youzefovitch had joined forces at Bernécourt while Müller's brigade was at Pont-à-Mousson. Since they mustered enough troops to be a match for Durutte's 12,000 men, they determined to march to Metz and offer battle. On 8 April, Müller was ordered to support the operations of Youzefovitch. On 10 April, as Müller's troops began to advance toward Woippy and Lorry-lès-Metz, a messenger arrived with information that Youzefovitch and Durutte had begun negotiations. News had been received that Napoleon abdicated, Louis XVIII was king, and the war was ended.
