= Paul Grenier =

French general (1768–1827)

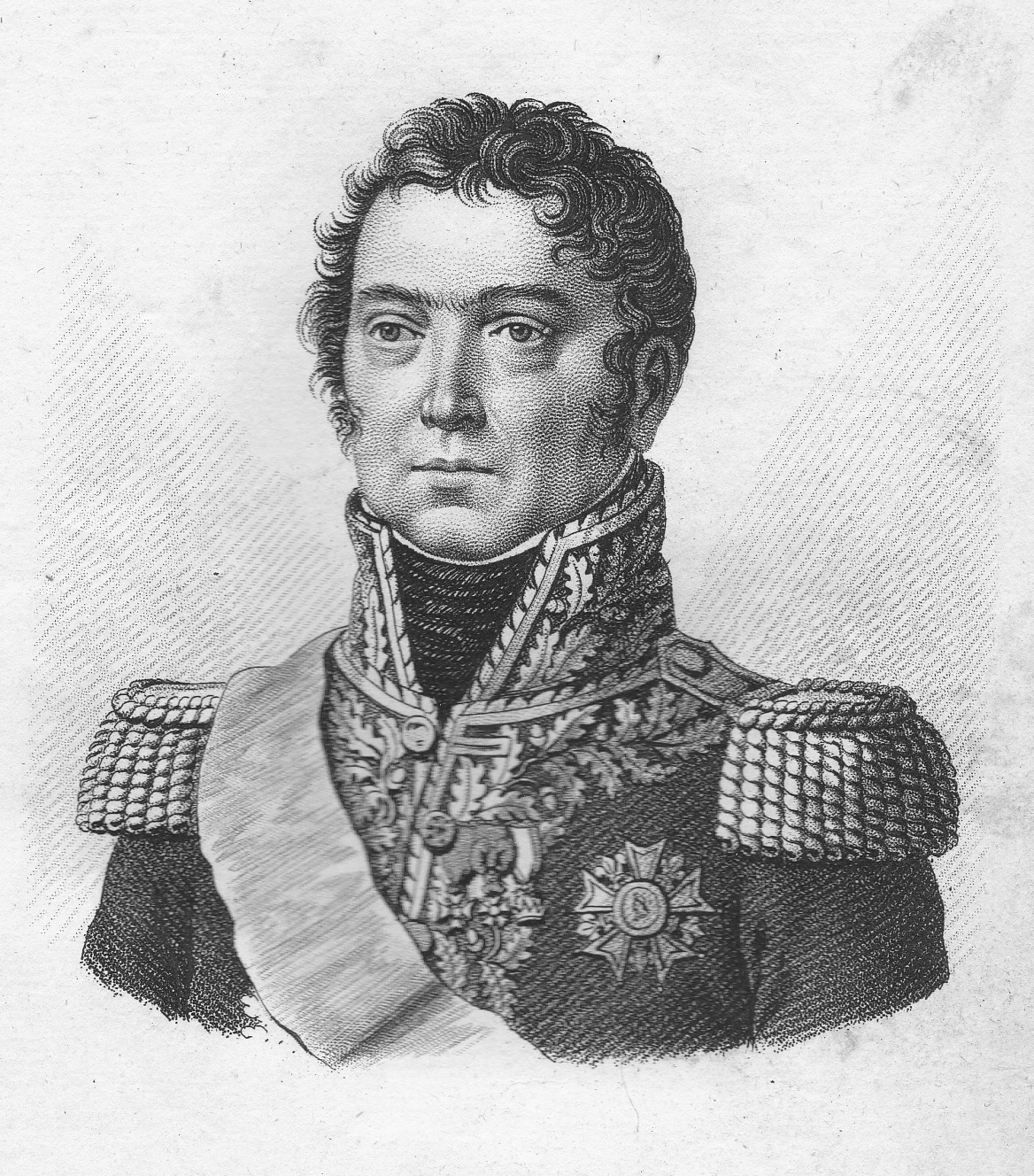
- Paul Grenier
- Born: 29 January 1768; Saarlouis, France
- Died: 17 April 1827 (aged 59) Dammartin-Marpain, Jura, France
- Allegiance: France
- Branch: Infantry
- Service years: 1784–1815
- Rank: General of Division
- Conflicts: War of the First Coalition; Battle of Valmy; Battle of Jemappes; Battle of Fleurus; Battle of Würzburg; Battle of Neuwied; War of the Second Coalition; Battle of Verona; Battle of Magnano; Battle of Cassano; Battle of Höchstädt; Battle of Ampfing; Battle of Hohenlinden; War of the Fifth Coalition; Battle of Sacile; Battle of Caldiero; Battle of Piave River; Battle of Tarvis; Battle of Sankt Michael; Battle of Raab; Battle of Wagram; War of the Sixth Coalition; Battle of Möckern; Battle of Feistritz; Battle of the Mincio River
- Awards: 1808, Count of the Empire
- Other work: 1818, Chamber of Deputies

Count Paul Grenier (French pronunciation: [pɔl gʁənje]; 29 January 1768 – 17 April 1827) was a French military officer. He joined the French royal army and rapidly rose to general officer rank during the French Revolutionary Wars. He led a division in the 1796-1797 campaign in southern Germany. During the 1800 campaign in the Electorate of Bavaria he was a wing commander. Beginning in 1809, in the Napoleonic Wars, Emperor Napoleon entrusted him with corps commands in the Italian theater. A skilled tactician, he was one of the veteran generals who made the Napoleonic armies such a formidable foe to the other European powers. After the Bourbon Restoration he retired from the army and later went into politics. Grenier is one of the names inscribed under the Arc de Triomphe.

== French Revolution ==
Born in 1768 to a father who was a minor government official in Saarlouis (then a French territory), Grenier joined the French royal army as a private soldier in the Nassau Infantry Regiment on 21 December 1784. After the French Revolution broke out he continued in the army. He fought at the Battle of Valmy, becoming a captain. After notable actions at the Battle of Jemappes, he received promotion to adjutant general. He was elevated to the rank of general of brigade on 29 April 1794. Grenier later fought at the Battle of Fleurus in Jean Étienne Championnet's division. His brigade included the 18th Line Infantry Regiment and the 1st Dragoon Regiment. For his distinguished actions, he was promoted to general of division on 11 October. He commanded the advance guard at the passage of the Rhine River on 6 September 1795. He led a division at the Battle of Würzburg on 3 September 1796. Under his leadership were three battalions each of the 20th Light, 16th Line, and 67th Line Infantry Demi-Brigades, one battalion of the 23rd Line Infantry Regiment, the 1st and 2nd Dragoon Regiments, the 6th Chasseurs à Cheval Regiment, one foot artillery company, and one horse artillery company. He won praise for his leadership in the Battle of Neuwied on 18 April 1797.

During the War of the Second Coalition, Grenier led a division at the battles of Verona, Magnano, and Cassano d'Adda in the spring of 1799. His command consisted of three battalions each of the 17th, 24th, and 106th Line Infantry Demi-Brigades, one battalion each of the 1st Polish Legion and 2nd Swiss Legion, 450 cavalry, and a foot artillery company. Later he fought in the Army of the Alps under Championnet. While leading 8,000 men of his division, he defeated Friedrich Heinrich von Gottesheim and 5,000 Austrians at Fossano on 16 September 1799. For a loss of 200 killed and wounded, his troops inflicted 300 killed and wounded on their opponents and captured 700 more. At Centallo on 31 October, Grenier's 7,000 troops fought 15,000 Austrians under Michael von Melas. This time he was drubbed, losing 1,000 casualties and four guns, while the Austrians only lost 200 men.

In 1800, he served under Jean Moreau, fighting at the Battle of Höchstädt on 18 and 19 June 1800. After the summer truce expired in November, Moreau placed him in charge of the three-division Left Wing. On 1 December, he supervised the divisions of Michel Ney and Jean Hardÿ in a successful rearguard action in the Battle of Ampfing. One historian writes, "Grenier possessed an unmatched knowledge of complex tactical evolutions." Two days later, he commanded the three divisions of Ney, Louis Bastoul (for the wounded Hardÿ), and Claude Legrand in Moreau's decisive victory at the Battle of Hohenlinden.

== Napoleonic Wars ==
Grenier became the governor of Mantua after the 1805 campaign. Emperor Napoleon I made him a count of the Empire.

At the start of the 1809 campaign, Grenier commanded an infantry division in Eugène de Beauharnais' Army of Italy. He fought at the Battle of Sacile on 16 April. At the Battle of Piave River on 8 May, he led a 16,800-strong corps of two divisions. At the Piave, his successful attack on the right flank caused the Austrian withdrawal. He intercepted and crushed Franz Jellacic's Austrian division in the Battle of Sankt Michael on 25 May, where he demonstrated his superior generalship. He also led his corps at the Battle of Raab on 14 June and at the Battle of Wagram on 5–6 July. At the latter battle he commanded three divisions and was rewarded with the Grand Cross of the Légion d'honneur.

Historian Frederick C. Schneid rates Grenier above Auguste Marmont and Jacques MacDonald, both of whom became marshals in 1809. He writes that Eugene's

"... corps commanders were some of the better generals of the empire. Of the three generals promoted to Marshal of France in 1809, two participated in the campaign in Italy. The best of the lot, however, was not one of the two, but General Paul Grenier."

The spring of 1813 found Grenier serving under Eugène in Saxony as Napoleon assembled a new army to replace the one destroyed in Russia. In the Battle of Möckern on 5 April, Grenier was wounded. After the summer armistice, Eugène and Grenier returned to Italy to prepare the Italian army for hostilities with Austria. One authority notes that Grenier was "perhaps the best commander in Italy" at this time and was assigned to lead the 1st Corps. During August 1813, he led his troops with success against the Austrian army of Johann von Hiller near Villach. When Hiller established a bridgehead across the Drava River at Feistritz an der Drau, Grenier attacked and defeated the Austrians on 6 September. The Franco-Italian strategic situation soon deteriorated and Eugène slowly withdrew to the Adige River in October and November. On 31 October, Grenier won a smart victory over Christoph Ludwig von Eckhardt's column at Bassano del Grappa, sending the Austrians fleeing into the mountains. He commanded his corps under Eugène at the Battle of the Mincio River on 8 February 1814. In independent command, he defeated an Austrian force at Parma in northeast Italy on 2 March 1814. Hostilities ended in mid-April when the news of Napoleon's abdication arrived.

== Later career ==
Grenier played a role in the provisional government after the Hundred Days. He retired from military service at the second restoration of King Louis XVIII. In 1818 he became a deputy in the Assembly. He died on 17 April 1827 in Dammartin-Marpain. The name GRENIER is inscribed on Column 14 of the Arc de Triomphe.
