= Daniel Mécsery =

Hungarian military officer (1759–1823)

Daniel Mecséry de Tsoor
- Born: 29 September 1759; Kőszeg, Kingdom of Hungary
- Died: 30 December 1823 (aged 64) Vienna, Austrian Empire
- Allegiance: (Habsburg monarchy) Habsburg Austria; Austrian Empire
- Branch: Cavalry
- Rank: Feldmarschall-Leutnant
- Conflicts: French Revolutionary Wars; Battle of Villers-en-Cauchies; Battle of Biberach; Battle of Stockach; Battle of Hohenlinden; Napoleonic Wars; Battle of Elchingen; Battle of Raab
- Awards: Military Order of Maria Theresa, KC 1796, CC 1808
- Other work: Freiherr, 1806; Privy Councillor, 1819

Daniel Mecséry de Tsoor (29 September 1759 – 30 December 1823) commanded the left wing of the Austrian army at the Battle of Raab during the Napoleonic Wars. In the early part of the French Revolutionary Wars, he served as an officer in the 3rd hussar regiment, distinguishing himself at Biberach in 1796 and later rising to command the 10th hussar regiment in 1798. Promoted to general officer in 1800, he led the advance guard at Hohenlinden and the rear guard at Lambach. In 1805 he led his troops at Elchingen. At Eschenau on 20 October 1805 he was seriously injured on his head and bust, his miraculous recovery of the grievous wounds earning him "the Toughest Headed Hungarian" nickname. He was elevated in rank to Feldmarschall-Leutnant in 1809. From 1814 he held the position of Commanding General of Silezia and Moravia. Became a member of the Hofkriegsrat (1815) and the Interior Privy Council. Died at Vienna in 1823.

Mecséry was decorated by both the Knight's Cross (11 May 1796), and the Commander's Cross (1808) of the Military Order of Maria Theresa.
