= Dimitri Mikhailovich Youzefovitch =

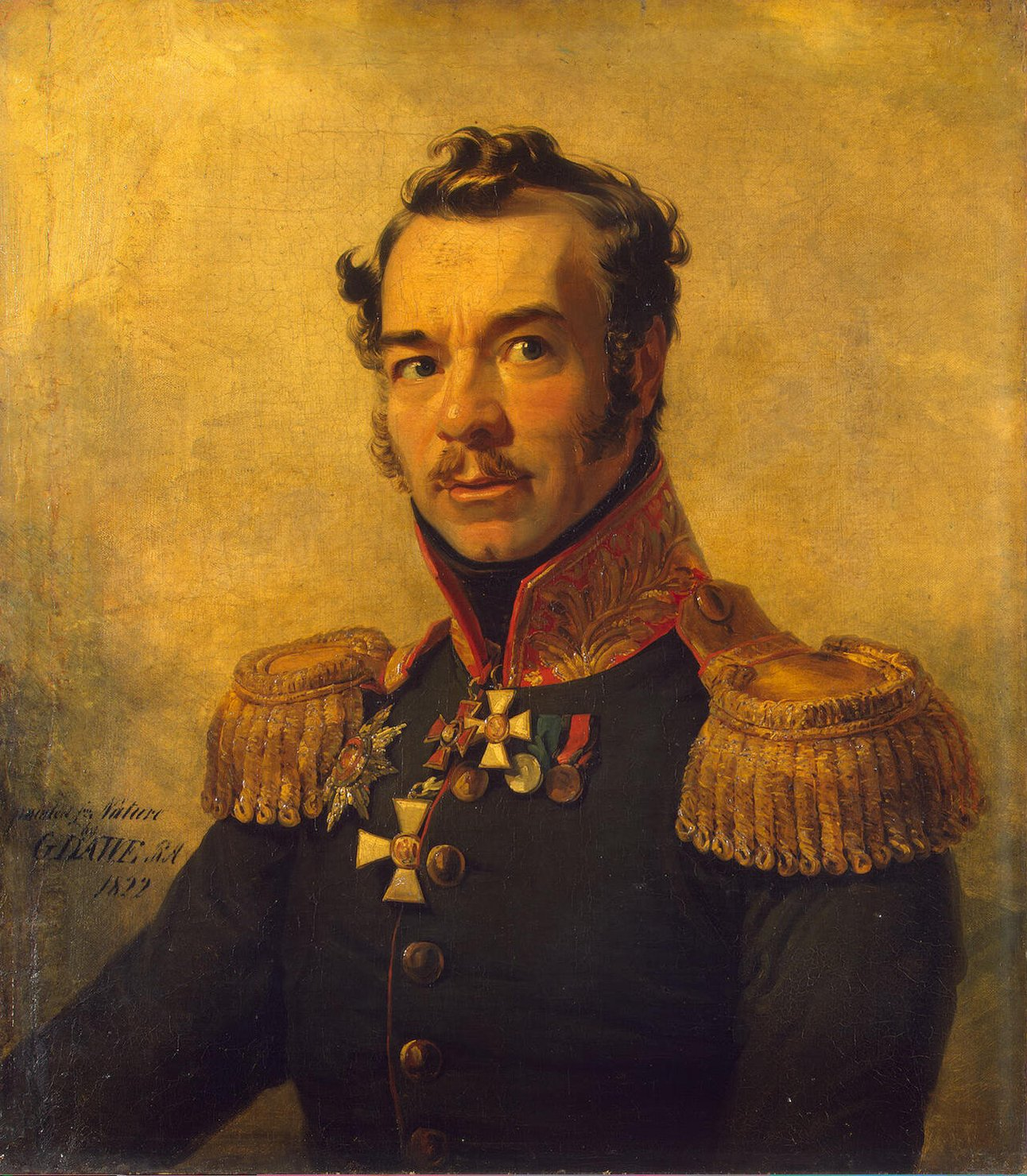
- Portrait by George Dawe
- Born: 1777
- Died: 1821 (aged 43–44)
- Occupation: Russian general

Dimitri Mikhailovich Youzefovitch (1777–1821) was a Russian nobleman from the Poltava region. He is most notable for serving as a general in the Napoleonic Wars, especially his leadership of the force which besieged Metz in 1814. He was also commandant of Nancy after Paris's surrender.

== Life ==
He joined the army aged 11, as a sergeant in the Preobrazhensky Life Guards Regiment. On 1 January 1795 he was promoted to captain and began active service, before transferring (still as a captain) into the Ekaterynoslavsky Cuirassier Regiment two years later.
