= Battle of Abensberg order of battle =

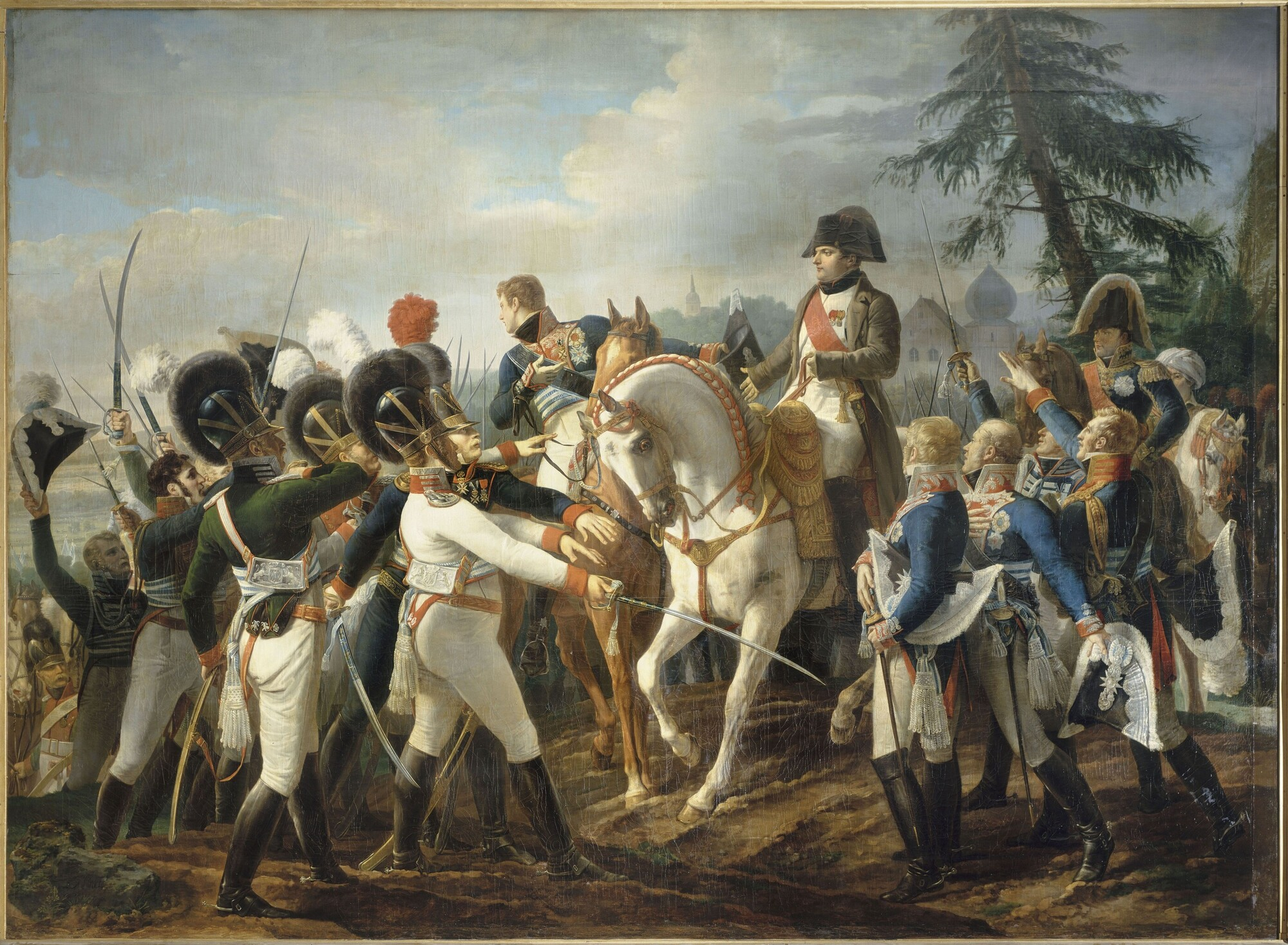
Napoleon speaks to Bavarian troops.

The Battle of Abensberg was fought on 20 April 1809, between a French-led force under the command of Napoleon on one side and three Austrian corps led by Johann von Hiller, Archduke Louis of Austria, and Michael von Kienmayer on the other. The Austrians formed the left wing of Archduke Charles, Duke of Teschen's main army and were under the overall command of Hiller. Napoleon's French troops, reinforced by troops from the Kingdom of Bavaria and the Kingdom of Württemberg outfought their opponents, inflicted heavy losses, and forced the Austrians to retreat to the southeast.

During the fighting, 55,000 French and German troops faced 42,000 Austrian soldiers. Of these, only about 25,000 on each side became involved in the fighting. The Austrians lost 2,710 killed and wounded, plus about 4,000 captured. Allied losses were 215 Frenchmen, 146 Württembergers, and 746 Bavarians, for a total of 1,107.

== Austrian forces ==
Left Wing: Feldmarschall-Leutnant Johann von Hiller

=== VI Armeekorps ===
Johann von Hiller

Feldmarschall-Leutnant Johann von Hiller (35,639)

- Reserve Artillery: Feldmarschall-Leutnant Karl von Rouvroy
  - Three 12-pdr position batteries (18 guns), 6-pdr position battery (6 guns)
- Division: Feldmarschall-Leutnant Friedrich Kottulinsky
  - Brigade: General-Major Otto von Hohenfeld
    - Klebek Infantry Regiment # 14 (3 battalions)
    - Jordis Infantry Regiment # 59 (3 battalions)
    - 6-pdr brigade battery (8 guns)
  - Brigade: General-Major Nikolaus Weissenwolf
    - Deutschmeister Infantry Regiment # 4 (3 battalions)
    - Kerpen Infantry Regiment # 49 (3 battalions)
    - 6-pdr brigade battery (8 guns)
  - Artillery: 6-pdr position battery (6 guns)
- Division: Feldmarschall-Leutnant Franz Jellacic (Jellacic detached at Munich)
  - Brigade: General-Major Josef Hoffmeister (Brigade attached to Vincent)
    - Benjowsky Infantry Regiment # 31 (3 battalions)
    - Splenyi Infantry Regiment # 51 (3 battalions)
    - 6-pdr brigade battery (8 guns)
  - Brigade: General-Major Konstantin Ettingshausen (Brigade detached at Munich)
    - Esterhazy Infantry Regiment # 32 (3 battalions)
    - De Vaux Infantry Regiment # 45 (3 battalions)
    - 6-pdr brigade battery (8 guns)
  - Artillery: 6-pdr position battery (6 guns)
- Light Division: Feldmarschall-Leutnant Karl von Vincent
  - Brigade: General-Major Karl Dollmayer von Provenchères (Brigade detached at Munich)
    - Warasdin-Kreutzer Grenz Infantry Regiment # 5 (2 battalions)
    - 4th, 5th, 6th Vienna Freiwilligers battalions
    - O'Reilly Chevauxleger Regiment # 3 (8 squadrons)
    - 3-pdr Grenz brigade battery (8 guns)
    - 6-pdr cavalry battery (6 guns)
  - Brigade: General-Major Armand von Nordmann (Brigade detached at Moosburg)
    - Warasdin-St. George Grenz Infantry Regiment # 6 (2 battalions)
    - Rosenberg Chevauxleger Regiment # 6 (8 squadrons)
    - Liechtenstein Hussar Regiment # 7 (8 squadrons)
    - 3-pdr Grenz brigade battery (8 guns)
    - 6-pdr cavalry battery (6 guns)

=== V Armeekorps ===
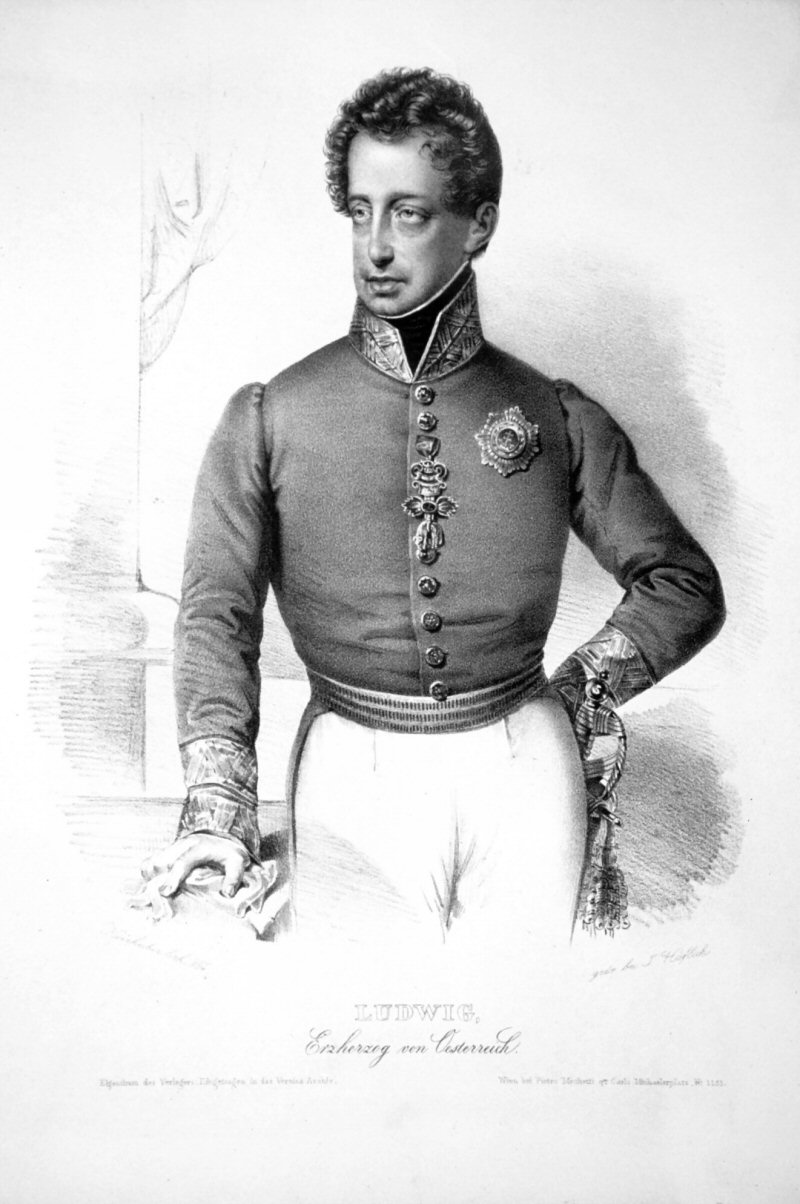
Archduke Louis

Feldmarschall-Leutnant Archduke Louis (32,266)

- Reserve Artillery: Major Adam Pfefferkorn
  - Two 12-pdr position batteries (12 guns), one 6-pdr cavalry battery (6 guns)
- Brigade: General-Major Ludwig Thierry (Brigade attached from III Armeekorps)
  - Kaiser Infantry Regiment # 1 (3 battalions)
  - Lindenau Infantry Regiment # 29 (3 battalions)
  - 6-pdr brigade battery (8 guns)
- Division: Feldmarschall-Leutnant Karl Friedrich von Lindenau (Division detached to I Reserve Armeekorps)
  - Brigade: General-Major Josef Mayer
    - Archduke Charles Infantry Regiment # 3 (3 battalions)
    - Stain Infantry Regiment # 50 (3 battalions)
    - 6-pdr brigade battery (8 guns)
  - Brigade: General-Major Ignaz Buol von Berenburg
    - Hiller Infantry Regiment # 2 (3 battalions)
    - Sztarrai Infantry Regiment # 33 (3 battalions)
  - Artillery: 6-pdr position battery (6 guns)
- Division: Feldmarschall-Leutnant Prince Heinrich XV of Reuss-Plauen
  - Brigade: General-Major Frederick Bianchi, Duke of Casalanza
    - Duka Infantry Regiment # 39 (3 battalions)
    - Gyulai Infantry Regiment # 60 (3 battalions)
    - 6-pdr brigade battery (8 guns)
  - Brigade: General-Major Franz Johann Schulz von Rothacker
    - Beaulieu Infantry Regiment # 58 (3 battalions)
    - 1st, 2nd, 3rd Vienna Freiwilligers battalions
  - Artillery: 6-pdr position battery (6 guns)
- Light Division: Feldmarschall-Leutnant Emmanuel von Schustekh-Herve
  - Brigade: General-Major Joseph, Baron von Mesko de Felsö-Kubiny
    - Broder Grenz Infantry Regiment # 7 (2 battalions)
    - Kienmayer Hussar Regiment # 8 (8 squadrons)
    - 3-pdr Grenz brigade battery (8 guns)
  - Brigade: General-Major Joseph Radetzky von Radetz
    - Gradiscaner Grenz Infantry Regiment # 8 (2 battalions)
    - Archduke Charles Uhlan Regiment # 3 (8 squadrons)
    - Artillery: 6-pdr cavalry battery (6 guns)

=== II Reserve Armeekorps ===
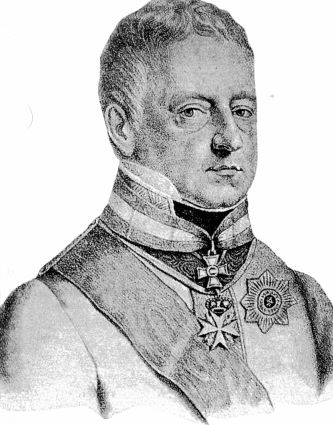
Michael von Kienmayer

Feldmarschall-Leutnant Michael von Kienmayer (7,975)

- Brigade: General-Major Konstantin Ghilian Karl d'Aspré
  - Puteani Grenadier battalion
  - Brezeczinsky Grenadier battalion
  - Scovaud Grenadier battalion
  - Kirchenbetter Grenadier battalion
  - Scharlach Grenadier battalion
  - 6-pdr brigade battery (8 guns)
- Brigade: General-Major Andreas von Schneller (Brigade detached to I Reserve Armeekorps)
  - Kaiser Cuirassier Regiment # 1 (6 squadrons)
  - Gottesheim Cuirassier Regiment # 6 (6 squadrons)
  - 6-pdr cavalry battery (6 guns)
- Brigade: General-Major Josef von Clary (4 squadrons attached to Thierry)
  - Levenehr Dragoon Regiment # 4 (6 squadrons)
  - Württemberg Dragoon Regiment # 3 (6 squadrons)
  - 6-pdr cavalry battery (6 guns)

=== Generals ===
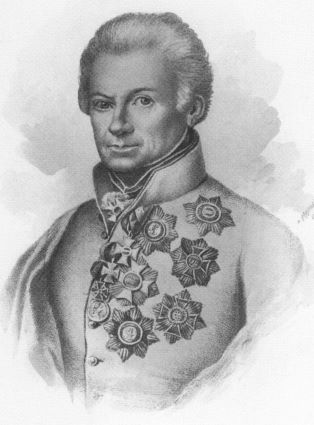
Prince Reuss

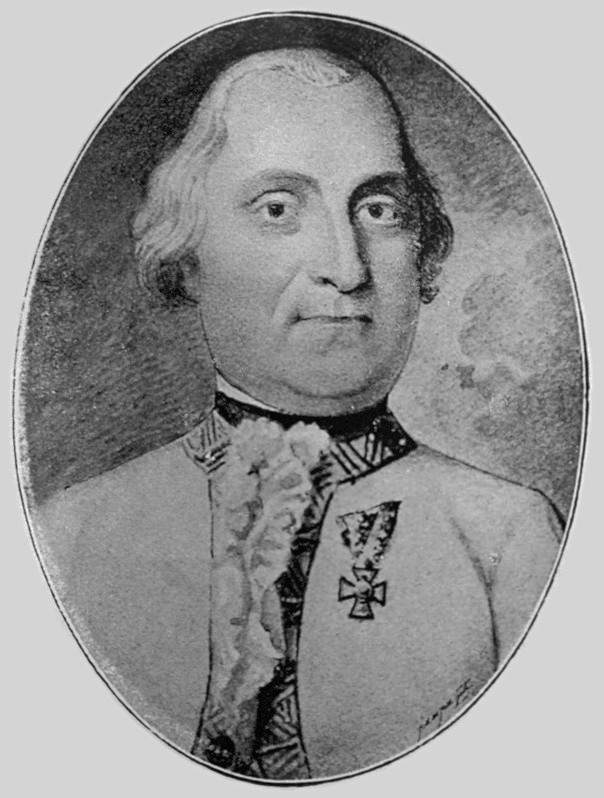
Franz Jellacic

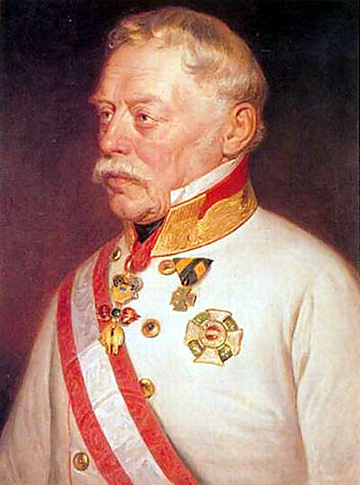
Josef Radetzky

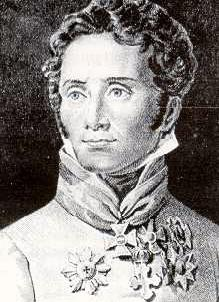
Frederick Bianchi

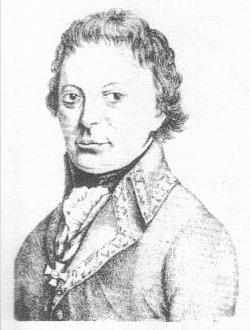
Konstantin d'Aspré

== French-Allied forces ==
Grande Armée: Napoleon I of France

=== Provisional Corps ===
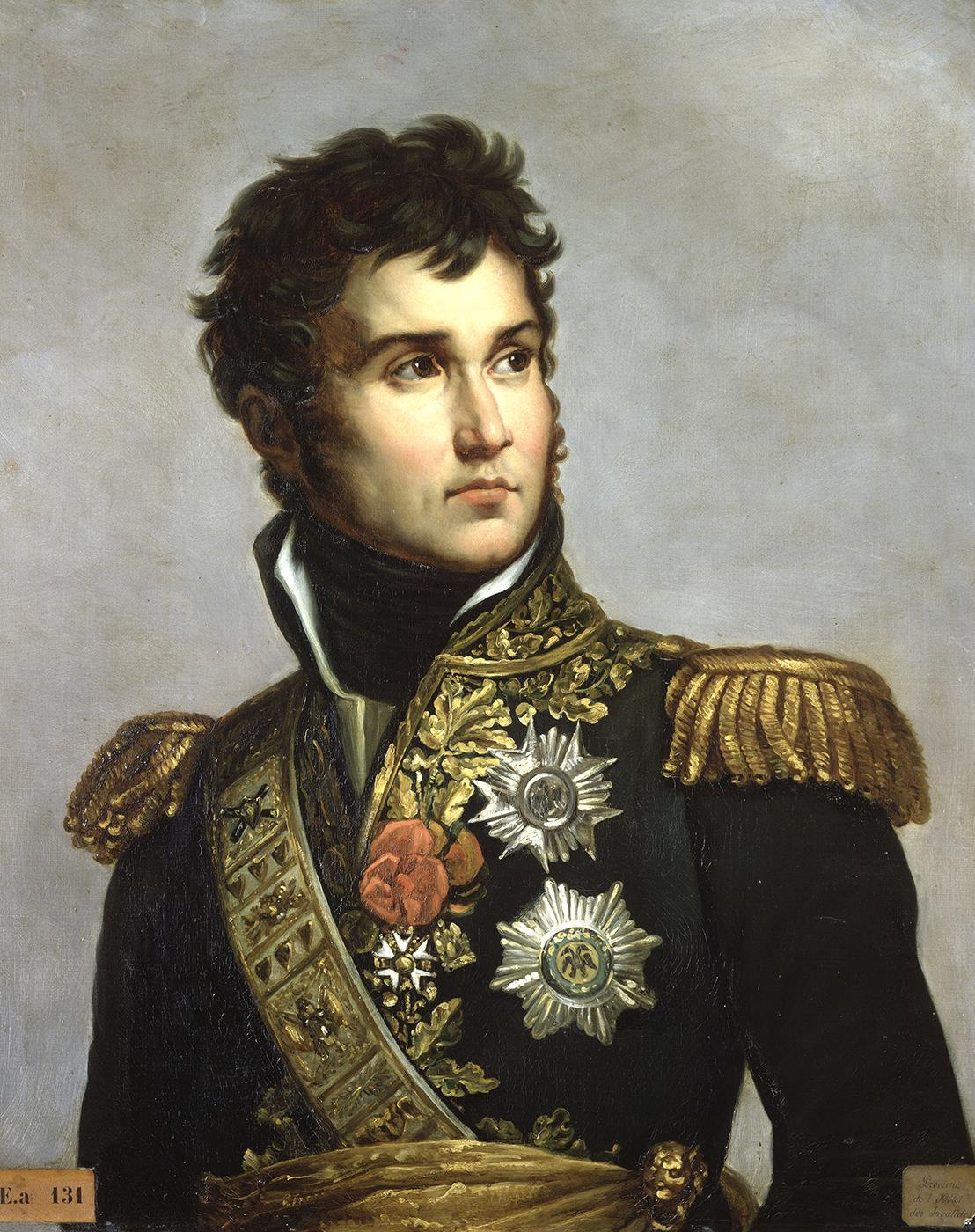
Jean Lannes

Marshal Jean Lannes

- Cavalry Brigade: General of Brigade Charles Claude Jacquinot (Attached from Montbrun)
  - 1st Chasseurs à cheval Regiment (3 squadrons)
  - 2nd Chasseurs à cheval Regiment (3 squadrons)
  - 12th Chasseurs à cheval Regiment (3 squadrons)
- 1st Division: General of Division Charles Antoine Morand (11,065) (Attached from III Corps)
  - Brigade: General of Brigade Nicolas Guiot de Lacour
    - 13th Light Infantry Regiment (3 battalions)
    - 17th Line Infantry Regiment (3 battalions)
    - 30th Line Infantry Regiment (3 battalions)
  - Brigade: General of Brigade François l'Huillier de Hoff
    - 61st Line Infantry Regiment (3 battalions)
    - 65th Line Infantry Regiment (3 battalions) (Regiment detached at Regensburg)
  - Divisional Artillery: 8-pdr foot battery (8 guns), 4-pdr horse battery (4 guns)
- 3rd Division: General of Division Charles-Étienne Gudin de La Sablonnière (11,440) (Attached from III Corps)
  - Brigade: General of Brigade Claude Petit
    - 7th Light Infantry Regiment (3 battalions)
  - Brigade: General of Brigade Pierre Boyer
    - 12th Line Infantry Regiment (3 battalions)
    - 21st Line Infantry Regiment (3 battalions)
  - Brigade: General of Brigade Jean Duppelin
    - 25th Line Infantry Regiment (3 battalions)
    - 85th Line Infantry Regiment (3 battalions)
  - Divisional Artillery: 8-pdr foot battery (6 guns), 4-pdr horse battery (6 guns)
- 1st Heavy Cavalry Division: General of Division Étienne Marie Antoine Champion de Nansouty (5,337) (Attached from Reserve)
  - Brigade: General of Brigade Jean-Marie Defrance
    - 1st Carabinier Regiment (4 squadrons)
    - 2nd Carabinier Regiment (4 squadrons)
  - Brigade: General of Brigade Jean-Pierre Doumerc
    - 2nd Cuirassier Regiment (4 squadrons)
    - 9th Cuirassier Regiment (4 squadrons)
  - Brigade: General of Brigade Antoine Louis Decrest de Saint-Germain
    - 3rd Cuirassier Regiment (4 squadrons)
    - 12th Cuirassier Regiment (4 squadrons)
  - Divisional Artillery: Two 8-pdr horse batteries (12 guns)
- 2nd Heavy Cavalry Division: General of Division Raymond-Gaspard de Bonardi de Saint-Sulpice (3,411) (Attached from III Corps, one brigade guarding Saal)
  - Brigade: General of Brigade François Marie Clément de la Roncière
    - 1st Cuirassier Regiment (4 squadrons)
    - 5th Cuirassier Regiment (4 squadrons)
  - Brigade: General of Brigade Marie Adrien François Guiton
    - 10th Cuirassier Regiment (4 squadrons)
    - 11th Cuirassier Regiment (4 squadrons)
  - Divisional Artillery: 8-pdr horse battery (6 guns)

=== VII (Bavarian) Corps ===
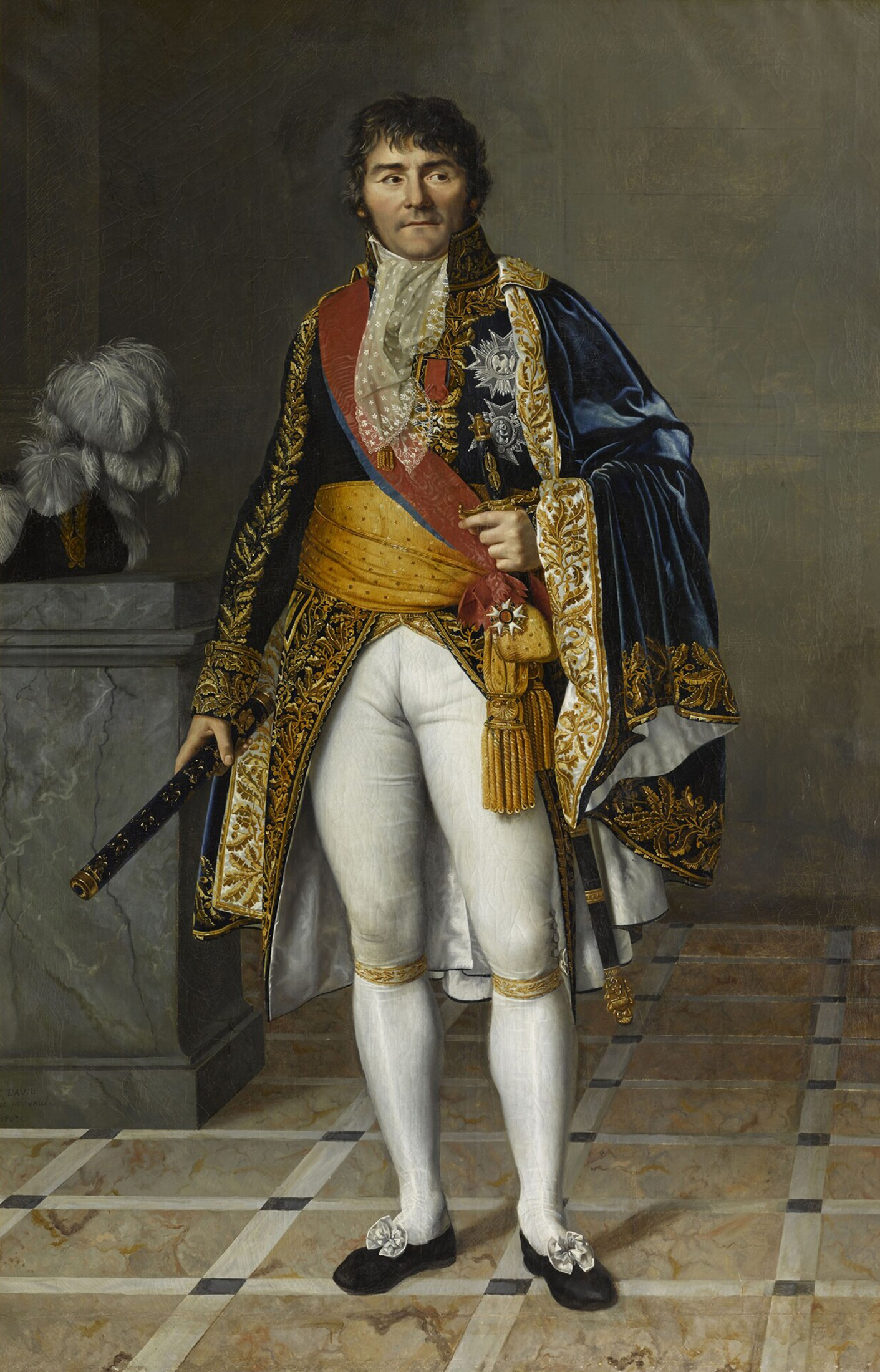
François Lefebvre

Marshal François Joseph Lefebvre

- Artillery Reserve: Colonel Calonge
  - Three 12-pdr position batteries (18 guns)
- 1st Bavarian Division: Lieutenant-General Crown Prince Ludwig of Bavaria
  - Brigade: General-Major Rechberg
    - 1st Habermann Light battalion
    - Leib Regiment (2 battalions)
    - 2nd Prince Royal Regiment (2 battalions)
  - Brigade: General-Major Stengel
    - 4th Salern Regiment (2 battalions)
    - 8th Duc Pius Regiment (2 battalions)
  - Cavalry Brigade: General-Major Zandt
    - Minuzzi Dragoon Regiment (2 squadrons)
    - Prince Royal Chevau-léger Regiment (4 squadrons)
  - Artillery: Two 6-pdr foot batteries, 6-pdr horse battery (18 guns)
- 2nd Bavarian Division: Lieutenant-General Karl Philipp von Wrede
  - Brigade: General-Major Minuzzi
    - 6th Laroche Light battalion
    - 3rd Prince Karl Regiment (2 battalions)
    - 13th Regiment (2 battalions)
  - Brigade: General-Major Beckers
    - 6th Duc Wilhelm Regiment (2 battalions)
    - 7th Löwenstein Regiment (2 battalions)
  - Cavalry Brigade: General-Major Preysing
    - König Chevau-léger Regiment (4 squadrons)
    - Leiningen Chevau-léger Regiment (4 squadrons)
  - Artillery: Two 6-pdr foot batteries, 6-pdr horse battery (18 guns)
- 3rd Bavarian Division: Lieutenant-General Bernhard Erasmus von Deroy
  - Brigade: General-Major Siebein
    - 5th Buttler Light battalion
    - 9th Isenburg Regiment (2 battalions)
    - 10th Juncker Regiment (2 battalions)
  - Brigade: General-Major Vincenti
    - 7th Günter Light battalion
    - 5th Regiment (2 battalions)
    - 14th Preysing Regiment (2 battalions)
  - Cavalry Brigade: General-Major Seydewitz
    - Taxis Dragoon Regiment (4 squadrons)
    - Bubenhoven Chevau-léger Regiment (4 squadrons)
  - Artillery: Two 6-pdr foot batteries, 6-pdr horse battery (18 guns)

=== Württemberg (later VIII) Corps ===
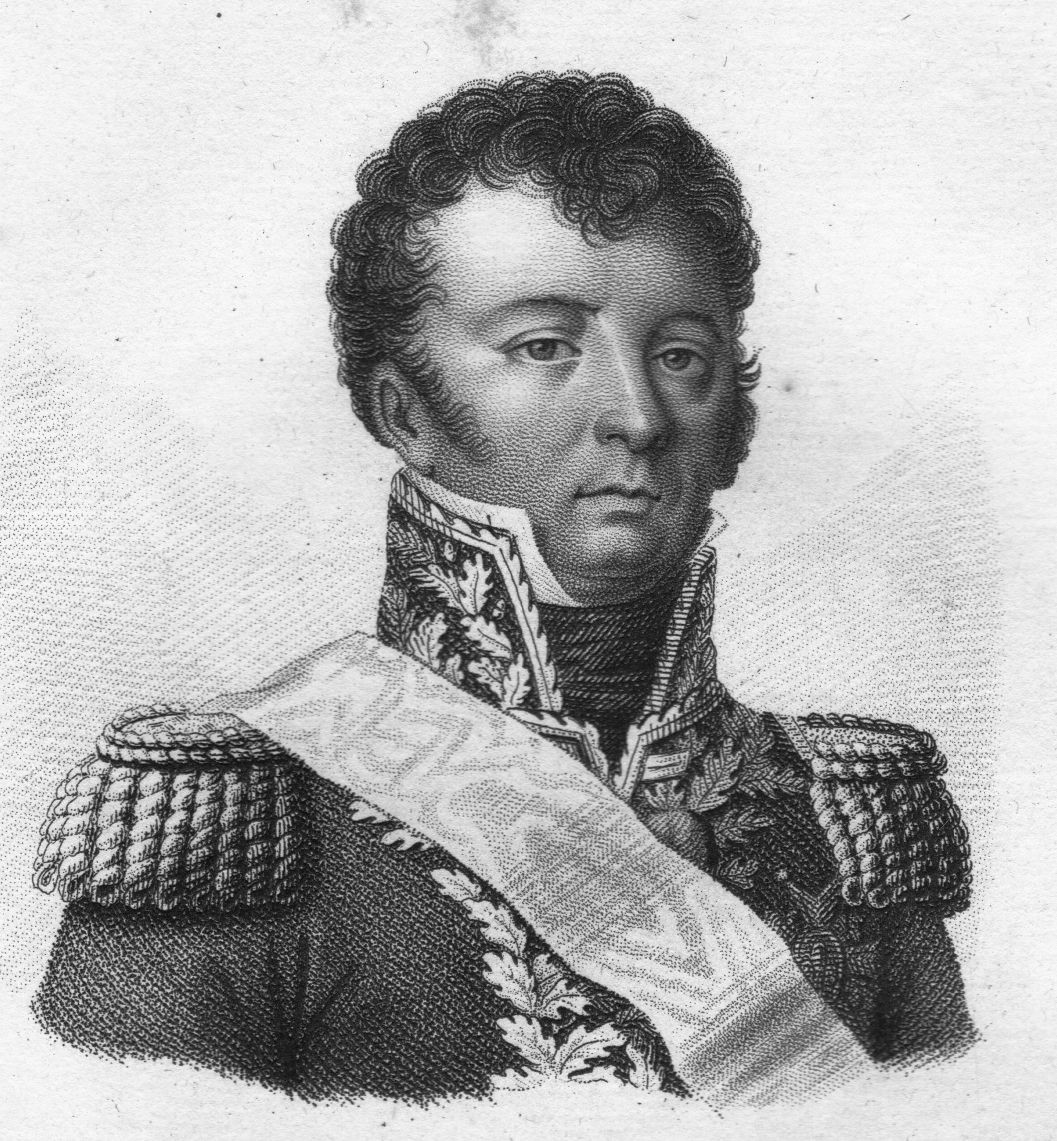
Dominique Vandamme

General of Division Dominique Vandamme

- Reserve Artillery: Colonel Schnadow
  - 6-pdr foot battery (10 guns), two 6-pdr horse batteries (12 guns)
- Württemberg Infantry Division: Lieutenant General Neubronn
  - Brigade: General-Major Friedrich von Franquemont
    - Prince Royal Regiment (2 battalions)
    - Duc Wilhelm Regiment (2 battalions)
    - 1st battalion Neubronn Fusilier Regiment
  - Brigade: General-Major Scharfenstein
    - Phull Regiment (2 battalions)
    - Camrer Regiment (2 battalions)
    - 2nd battalion Neubronn Fusilier Regiment
  - Light Brigade: General-Major Hügel
    - König Jäger battalion
    - 1st Wolff Light battalion
    - 2nd Bruselle Light battalion
- Württemberg Cavalry Division: Lieutenant General Wöllwarth
  - Brigade: General-Major Roeder
    - König Chevau-léger Regiment (4 squadrons)
    - Duc Henry Chevau-léger Regiment (4 squadrons)
  - Brigade: General-Major Stettner
    - König Chasseurs à cheval Regiment (4 squadrons)
    - Duc Louis Chevau-léger Regiment (4 squadrons)

=== Generals ===
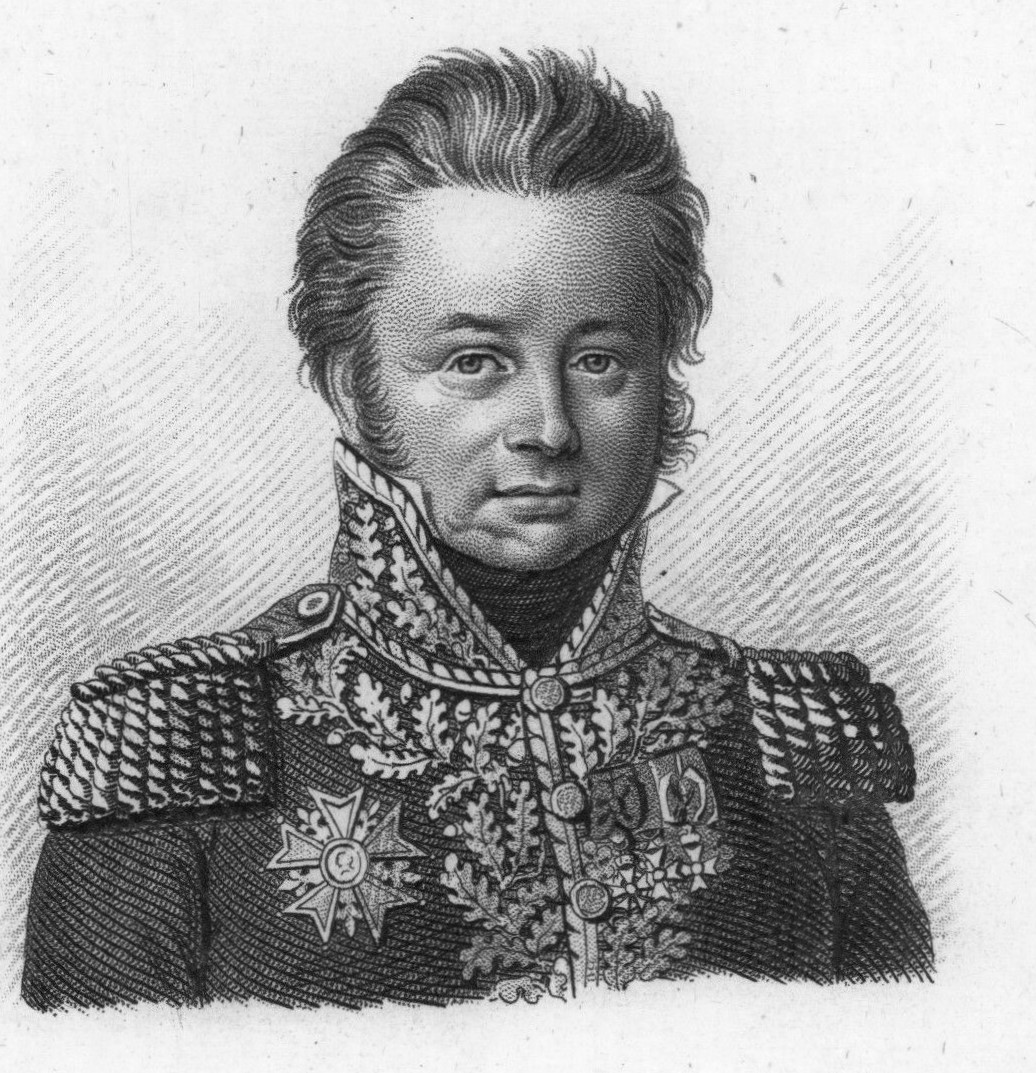
Charles Morand

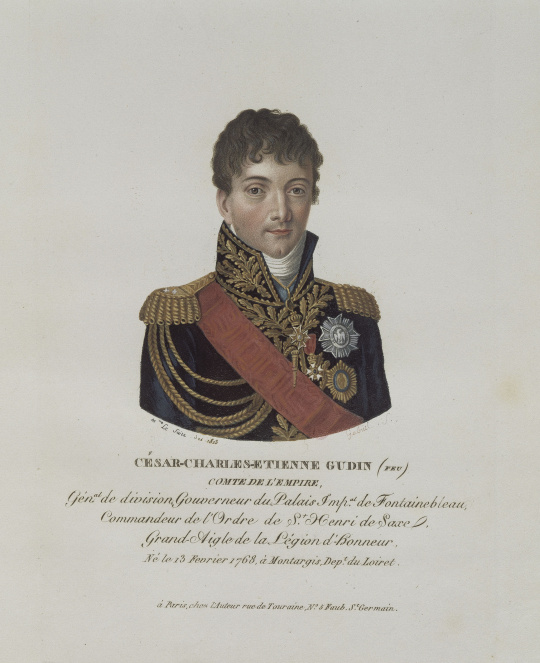
Charles Gudin

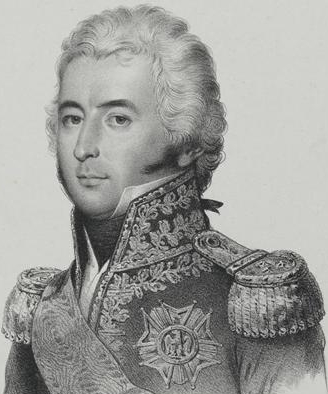
Étienne Nansouty

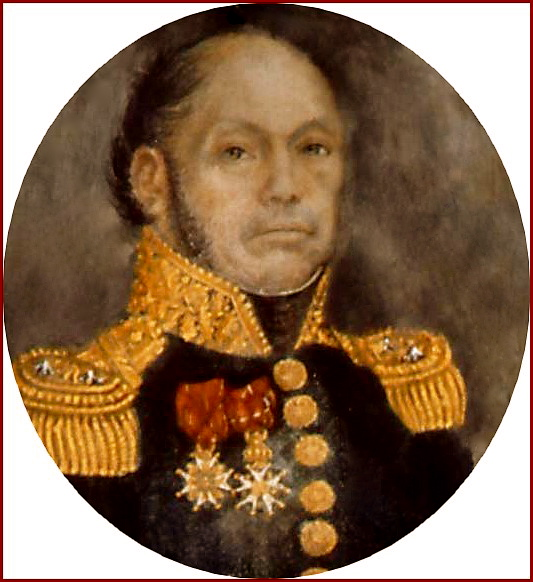
Jean Doumerc

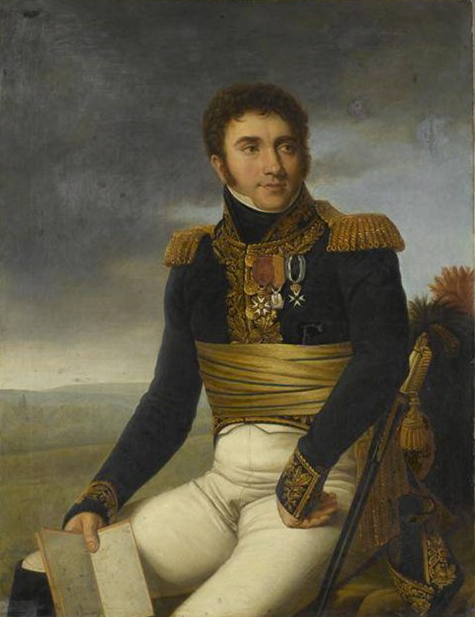
Jean Defrance

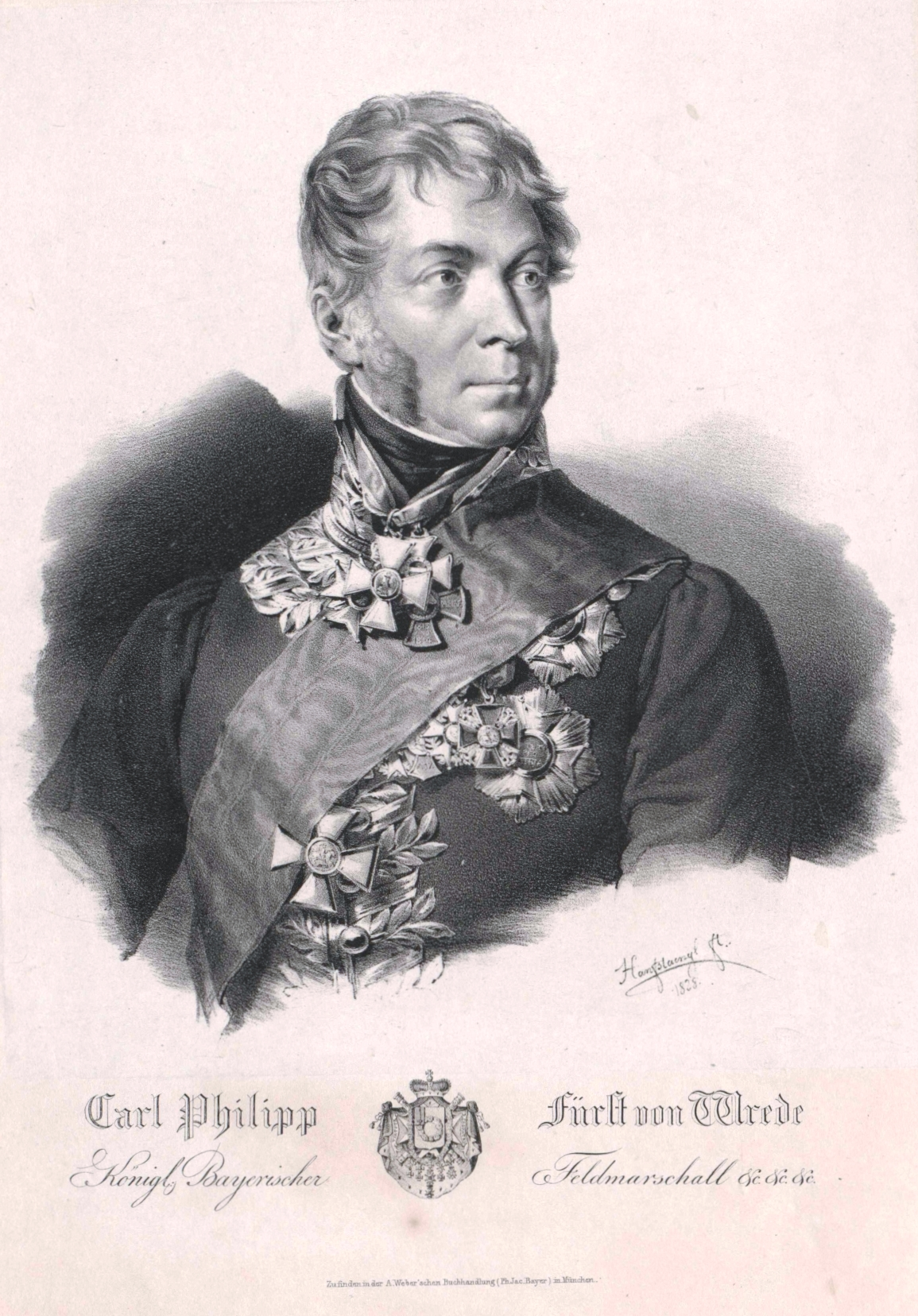
Karl von Wrede
