= Jean-Pierre Doumerc =

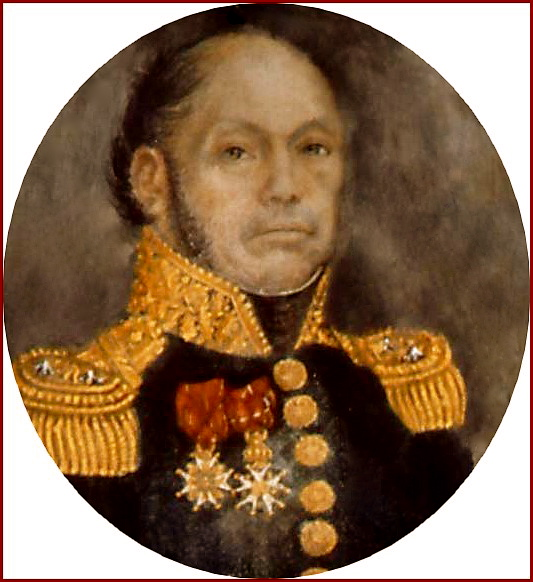
- Jean-Pierre Doumerc
- Born: 7 October 1767; Montauban, France
- Died: 29 March 1847 (aged 79) Paris, France
- Allegiance: France
- Branch: Cavalry
- Rank: General of Division
- Conflicts: French Revolutionary Wars; Napoleonic Wars
- Awards: Order of Saint Louis; Legion d'honneur: Officer 1804; Commander 1805; Grand Officer 1815; Grand Cross 1832
- Other work: Baron of the Empire 1808

Jean-Pierre, baron Doumerc (French pronunciation: [ʒɑ̃ pjɛʁ dumɛʁ]; 7 October 1767 – 29 March 1847), joined a French cavalry regiment at the beginning of the French Revolution and rose in rank to command a cuirassier regiment by the start of the First French Empire. During the Napoleonic Wars he first led cavalry brigades and later divisions in many of the important battles of the era. After retiring from the army in 1815, he briefly served again during the 1830s.

== Early career ==
Born on 7 October 1767 at Montauban, France, Doumerc enlisted in a cavalry regiment when the French Revolution broke out. He steadily gained advancement during the French Revolutionary Wars and in 1803 he was awarded a Star of the Légion d'honneur. The following year, he became an Officer of the Légion d'honneur and was colonel of the 9th Cuirassier Regiment. He fought at the Battle of Austerlitz on 2 December 1805 and became a Commander of the Légion d'honneur soon afterward. During the battle, the 9th Cuirassiers served in Étienne Champion de Nansouty's 1st Heavy Cavalry Division.

== General officer ==
Doumerc was appointed general of brigade on 31 December 1806, Baron of the Empire in 1808, and general of division on 30 November 1811. He led a heavy cavalry brigade in Nansouty's division at the Battle of Friedland on 14 June 1807.

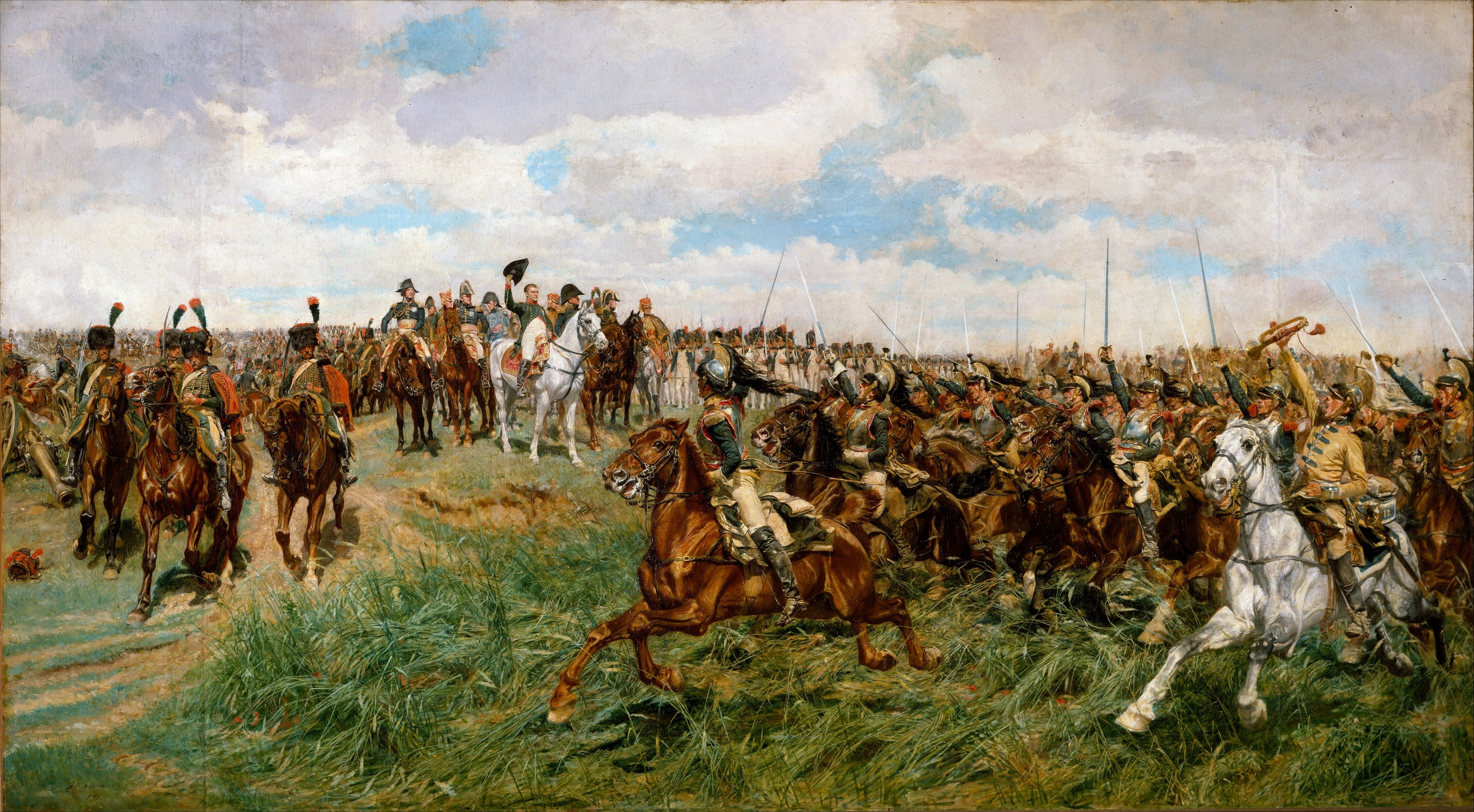
Friedland 1807 by Meissonier. Cuirassiers charge past Napoleon.

At the start of the War of the Fifth Coalition, Doumerc commanded a brigade in Nansouty's 1st Heavy Cavalry Division that included the 2nd Cuirassiers, 848 sabers, and his old 9th Cuirassiers, 875 sabers. Emperor Napoleon assigned the division to an ad hoc corps led by Marshal Jean Lannes. In the Battle of Abensberg on 20 April 1809, the corps fell upon the brigades of Ludwig Thierry and Joseph, Baron von Mesko de Felsö-Kubiny near Rohr in Niederbayern. After initial resistance, the outnumbered and outgeneraled Austrians were soon fleeing down the road to Rottenburg an der Laaber with the cuirassiers slashing at the fugitives.

Nansouty's division, less Antoine Louis Decrest de Saint-Germain's brigade, began pressing back Karl von Vincent's rear guard early on 21 April 1809. After a pause at mid-day, the French horsemen finally advanced and routed Vincent's cavalry which fled across the bridges of Landshut. The cuirassiers' role in the Battle of Landshut ended with the cavalrymen charging through the streets of the west bank suburb. Soon, infantry came up to occupy the town and later to successfully rush the bridges.

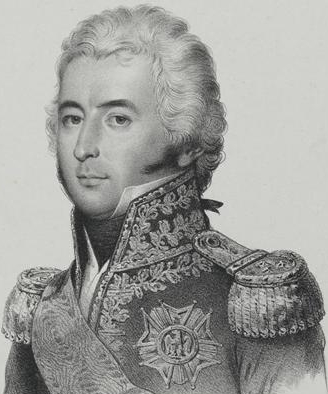
Doumerc was a brigadier in Étienne de Nansouty's division in 1807-1809.

At the Battle of Eckmühl on 22 April, the divisions of Nansouty and Raymond-Gaspard de Bonardi de Saint-Sulpice, consisting of eight cuirassier and two carabinier regiments stormed the Bettel Berg, a hill crowned with a regiment of Austrian infantry, 12 light cavalry squadrons, and 16 artillery pieces. After seeing a Bavarian charge defeated, the 8,000 French heavy cavalry surged forward. The enemy cavalry force countercharged but was beaten and the armored French horsemen overran the hilltop, capturing two batteries of Austrian 12-pounder cannons.

That evening, the famous moonlit cavalry action near Alteglofsheim occurred. Nansouty drew up his division with Jean-Marie Defrance's carabinier brigade in the center, flanked by the cuirassier brigades of Doumerc and Saint-Germain. Each brigade deployed with one regiment in the first line and one in the second. Bavarian and Württemberger cavalry formed to the right rear while Saint-Sulpice's division was held in reserve. The 66 Allied squadrons and 24 guns faced 30 squadrons of Austrians supported by 18 cannons. Andreas Schneller's brigade comprised 12 squadrons of cuirassiers; these were deployed on the right in two lines with one regiment of six squadrons in each line. On the Austrian left were 10 squadrons of hussars backed by eight squadrons of chevau-légers in the second line. After an exchange of cannon fire, the Austrians bravely and foolishly charged while the French trotted forward to meet them. In the darkness, sparks could be seen as the cavalrymen of both sides hacked at each other. Soon the second lines were also engaged in a heaving mass of horsemen. Finally, the Austrians broke and fled. The French reported taking 300 prisoners; other losses are not known.

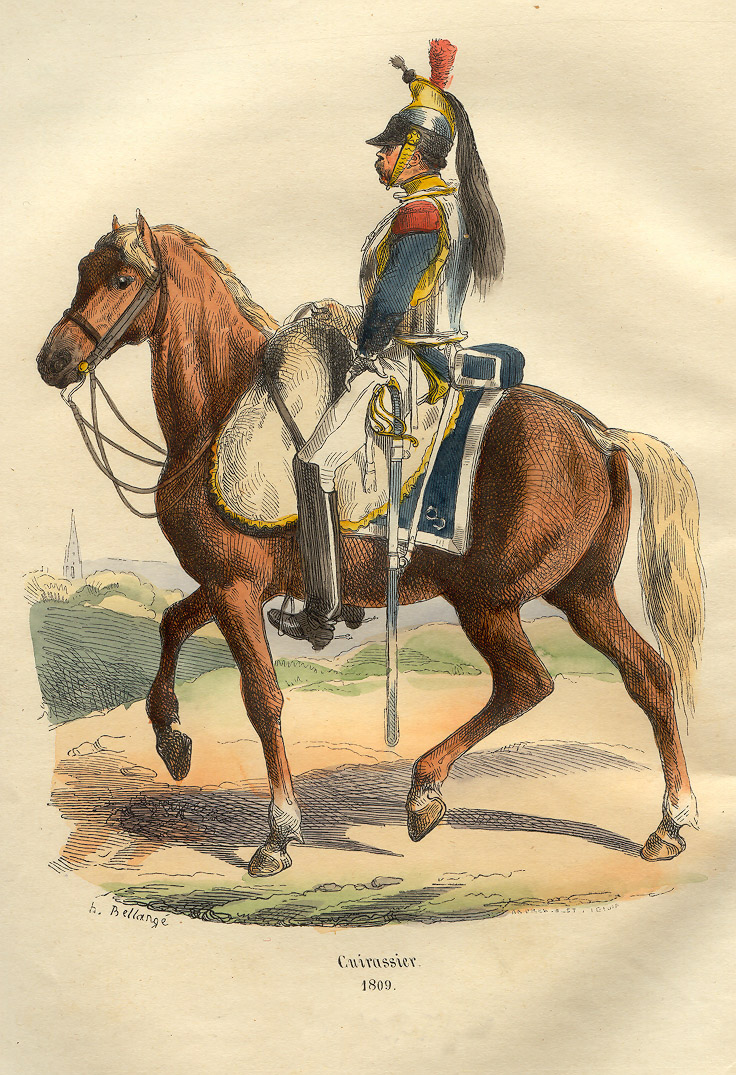
French Cuirassier in 1809

On 23 April in the Battle of Ratisbon, the two sides fought another cavalry action. On this occasion, the 40 heavy cavalry squadrons of Nanouty and Saint-Sulpice were joined by French light cavalry squadrons led by Louis-Pierre Montbrun. The Austrians employed 24 squadrons of cuirassiers and 32 squadrons of light cavalry. The various cavalry clashes lasted for two hours, until the Austrians pulled back within Regensburg (Ratisbon).

While the other two brigades of Nansouty's division fought at the Battle of Aspern-Essling on 22 May, sources are not clear if Doumerc's brigade participated. At the time of the Battle of Wagram, the 2nd Cuirassiers numbered 708 horsemen while the 9th counted 776 troopers. On 6 July, Archduke Charles, Duke of Teschen launched a dangerous counterattack against the French left wing. Napoleon threw Nansouty's division at Johann Kollowrat's Austrian III Armeekorps in attempt to stop his enemies. The charge drove a wedge between Kollowrat and the neighboring I Reserve Armeekorps, but was ultimately repulsed. The division lost 164 men killed, 436 men wounded, and 1,141 horses destroyed. Doumerc's 9th Cuirassiers lost its colonel and six officers wounded, 31 killed and 55 wounded. Even though the effort failed, it allowed Napoleon to gain the initiative. After this moment in the battle, the Austrian were forced to react to French maneuvers.

In the 1812 invasion of Russia, Doumerc led the 3rd Heavy Cavalry Division, a part of the III Cavalry Corps under Emmanuel Grouchy. Detached from its parent corps, the 3rd division fought at the First Battle of Polotsk on 16 to 18 August 1812. On the first day, Marshal Nicolas Oudinot suffered a tactical defeat and was wounded. Laurent Gouvion Saint-Cyr took over and on the 17th, he maneuvered as if preparing to retreat. The next day, he hurled the VI Corps, consisting of Bavarians, at the Russian left flank. The French II Corps attacked the Russian center while the French cavalry opposed the Russian right. Staring at defeat, the Russian commander Peter Wittgenstein threw in his last reserves, headed by depot squadrons of the Lifeguard Uhlans, Hussars, and Dragoons. The Russian horsemen achieved initial success. But they were checked by a Swiss regiment and broken by a charge of the 4th Cuirassier Regiment led by Frédéric de Berckheim, one of Doumerc's brigadiers.

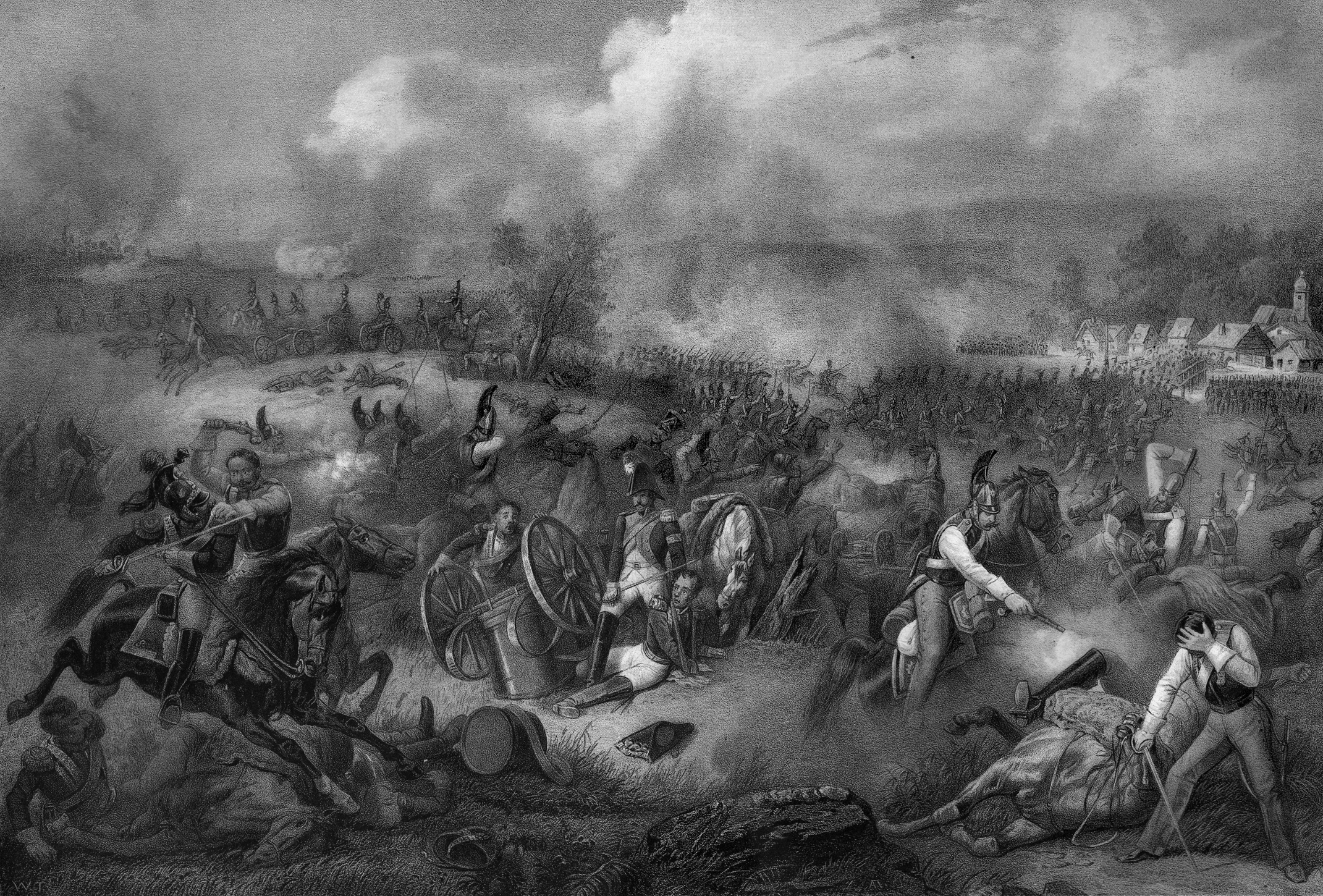
First Battle of Polotsk

Doumerc led his division at the Second Battle of Polotsk on 18 to 20 October. The 3rd Heavy Cavalry Division, including the 4th, 7th, and 14th Cuirassier Regiments, fought at the Battle of Berezina on 26 to 29 December. On the 26th, Oudinot and 11,000 troops, among them the 3rd Heavy, crossed to the west bank of the Berezina River and prepared to defend the two improvised bridges against a Russian attack. The next day, Pavel Chichagov belatedly realized that Napoleon had tricked him out of position and began attacking the French foothold from the south. On the 28th, Chichagov mounted a full-scale attack. During the action Oudinot was badly wounded and replaced in command by Michel Ney. Doumerc led his heavies in a "brilliant charge" that broke the back of Chichagov's effort and inflicted 2,000 casualties on the Russians. This and other heroic actions helped Napoleon's army to escape a deadly trap.

Throughout the 1813 campaign, Doumerc continued to lead the 3rd Heavy Cavalry Division. He was present at the Battle of Lützen on 2 May and at the Battle of Bautzen on 20 and 21 May. On 26 and 27 August, he commanded his division in Marie Victor de Fay, marquis de Latour-Maubourg's I Cavalry Corps at the Battle of Dresden. The division included the 4th and 7th Cuirassiers in Charles Lalaing d'Audenarde's brigade and the 7th, 23rd, 28th, and 30th Dragoon Regiments in Marie Antoine de Reiset's brigade, as well as two horse artillery batteries. Directed by Marshal Joachim Murat, the French cavalry fell upon the Allied left wing, which was isolated from the center and right by a rain-flooded stream. Unable to effectively defend itself because of wet powder, Ignaz Gyulai's Austrian corps was severely mauled by the rampaging French horsemen, backed by infantry and artillery. Mesko, the same general defeated in 1809, saw his division overrun before being taken prisoner by a trooper from Doumerc's 23rd Dragoons. A number of Austrian battalions were routed or forced to surrender. Altogether, 13,000 prisoners fell into French hands in this sector.

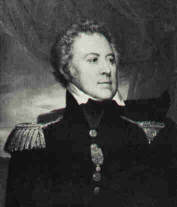
Latour-Maubourg

At the Battle of Leipzig on 16 October 1813, Napoleon made a bid to crush Karl Philipp, Prince of Schwarzenberg's Army of Bohemia. During the day's action, Doumerc took command of the I Cavalry Corps after Latour-Maubourg suffered a bad wound. After inconclusive fighting in the morning, the French emperor directed his cavalry to smash a hole in the Allied line at 2:00 PM. Schwarzenberg brought up the Austrian reserve cavalry and managed to slow the French drive. About 2:30 PM, Doumerc spotted a weak point in the enemy defenses and launched Étienne Tardif de Pommeroux de Bordesoulle's 1st Heavy Cavalry Division at it. The charge quickly dispersed two infantry battalions, overran 26 guns, and nearly cut its way to Czar Alexander I of Russia's headquarters. However, before either Murat or Doumerc could bring up support, Bordesoulle was counterattacked by the Czar's escort and a large force of Russian cuirassiers. The decisive moment passed and the day's battle ended with the Allies driven back to their start line but intact. After Napoleon's defeat at Leipzig, his former ally Bavaria joined the Allies and sent a corps to cut him off from France. At the Battle of Hanau, the French emperor completely outgeneraled the Bavarian Karl Philipp von Wrede, crushing his left flank with a powerful attack and carving an escape route for his troops. Doumerc led the 3rd Heavy Cavalry Division in the action.

At the Battle of La Rothiere on 1 February 1814, Doumerc led a 1,900-strong light cavalry division in Marshal Auguste Marmont's corps. His command consisted of the 2nd, 3rd, and 4th Chasseurs à cheval, the 1st Provisional Hussars, and 12 pieces of horse artillery. Doumerc led his cavalry division at the Battle of Champaubert on 10 February.

== Later career ==
After the abdication of Napoleon, Doumerc offered his services to King Louis XVIII. The king made him inspector general of three military districts, a Chevalier of the Order of Saint Louis, and a Grand Officer of the Légion d'honneur. During the Hundred Days, Doumerc accepted a military appointment by Napoleon. Because of this ill-timed move, he was no longer employed after the Battle of Waterloo. The 1830 July Revolution restored him to favor and he was named commander of the 18th Military Division by King Louis Philippe I. Upon retirement in 1832, the king bestowed upon him the Grand Cross of the Légion d'honneur. Doumerc died on 29 March 1847 in Paris. DOUMERC is engraved on Column 1 of the Arc de Triomphe.

A French military installation, the Quartier Doumerc was established in 1865 at Montauban, the general's birthplace. Named after the cavalry general, it housed the 10th Dragoons until 1936, when the 7th Regiment of Spahis took up residence. After the Second World War, the 9th Parachute and 35th Artillery Regiments occupied the camp. The Quartier Doumerc currently hosts the 17th Parachute Engineer Regiment.
