= Raymond-Gaspard de Bonardi de Saint-Sulpice =

French general (1761–1835)

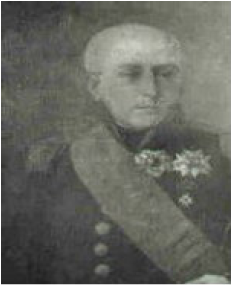
- General Saint-Sulpice
- Born: 23 October 1761; Paris, France
- Died: 20 June 1835 (aged 73); Paris, France
- Military career
- Allegiance: France
- Service years: 1777–1814
- Rank: General of Division
- Units: 2nd Heavy Cavalry Division (1807, 1809); Dargoons of the Guard (1812)
- Commands: Cavalry
- Conflicts: French Revolutionary Wars; Napoleonic Wars
- Awards: Comte Saint-Sulpice
- Other work: Écuyer cavalcadour de l'Impératrice (1804-1815); Governor of the castle of Fontainebleau (1813); Peer of France (from 1831)

Raymond-Gaspard de Bonardi, comte de Saint-Sulpice (French: [ʁɛmɔ̃ ɡaspaʁ də bɔnaʁdi də sɛ̃ sylpis]; 23 October 1761 – 20 June 1835) was a French general of the French Revolutionary Wars and Napoleonic Wars, noted for his actions as a heavy cavalry commander and who became a Peer of France towards the end of his life.

== Early life and Revolutionary Wars ==
A nobleman by birth, Saint-Sulpice joins the army as a sublieutenant in 1777, becoming a lieutenant-colonel in 1792 in the Army of the Alps. He is then suspended, from September 1793 to May 1795, because of his aristocratic ascendance. Despite the proclamation of the French Consulate, the career of Saint-Sulpice seems to stagnate until 1803, when he is finally promoted to brigadier general. With the proclamation of the Empire, Saint-Sulpice gets a position as Écuyer cavalcadour of the Empress Joséphine.

== Napoleonic Wars and Bourbon Restoration ==
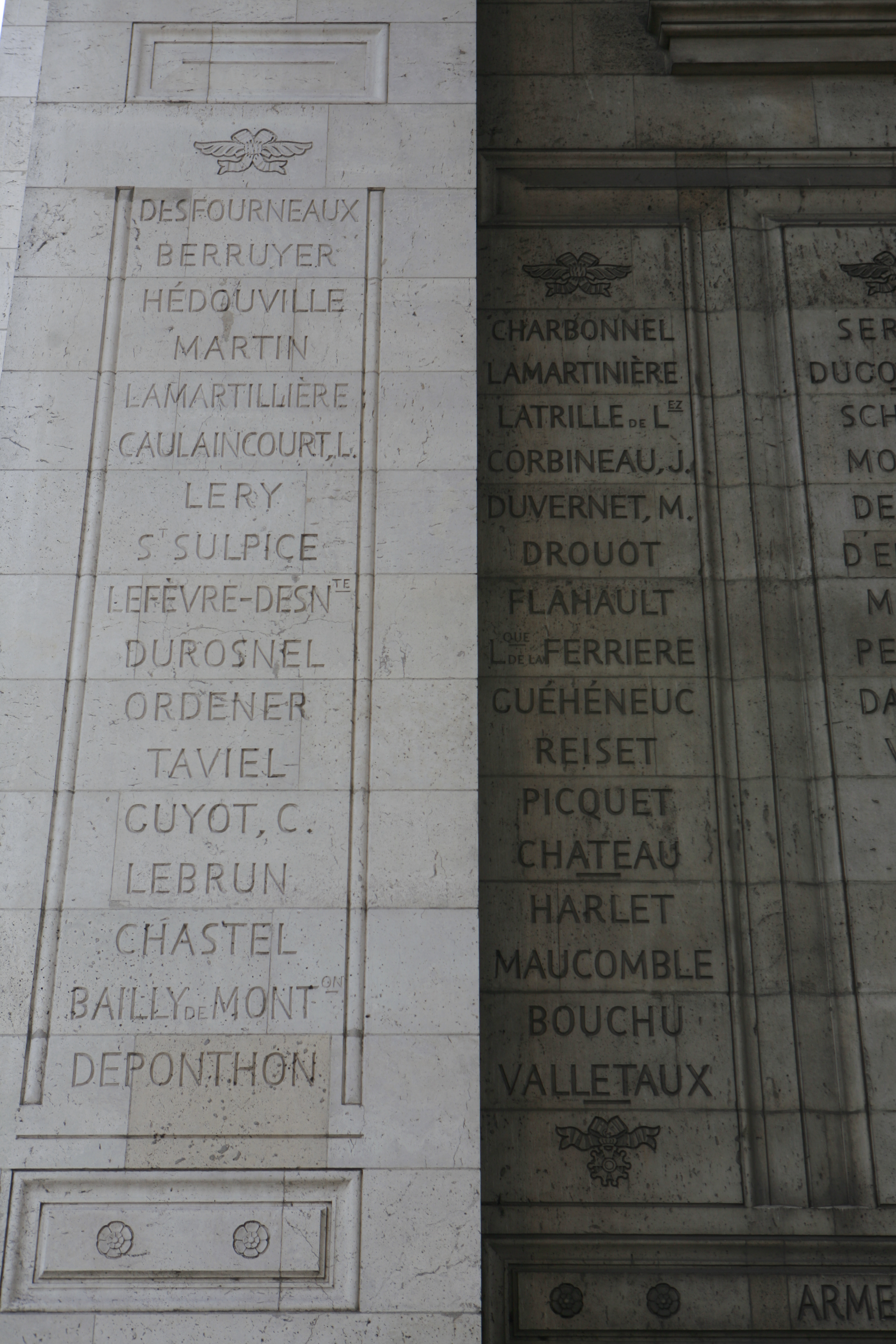
Saint-Sulpice's name is inscribed on the Arc de Triomphe (8th from the top on the left).

With the outbreak of the Napoleonic Wars, Saint-Sulpice is given the command of a cuirassier brigade in d'Hautpoul's 2nd heavy cavalry division of the cavalry reserve of the Grande Armée, which he will command between 1805 and 1807. At the battle of Eylau in 1807 Saint-Sulpice is wounded, but a week later, on the 14 of February, he gets promoted to general of division and takes command of the 2nd heavy cavalry division, replacing d'Hautpoul, who had died of his injuries. Named count of the Empire in 1808, he fights in most of the major engagements of the Fifth Coalition in 1809: Abensberg, Eckmühl, Ratisbon, Aspern-Essling and Wagram. During the French invasion of Russia, Saint-Sulpice is given command of the dragoon regiment of the Guard. The next year, in March 1813, he is named governor of the castle of Fontainebleau but then is called to serve in the Grande Armée again for the War of the Sixth Coalition, fighting in Saxony. In 1814, as the fighting continued, this time on French soil, Saint-Sulpice is assigned to serve under Marshal of the Empire Pierre Augereau, whose orders were to defend Lyon against the invading Allied armies. Retiring from active service, he became a Peer of France in 1831. His name appears on the Arc de Triomphe in Paris.
