= Karl Friedrich von Lindenau =

- Born: 1746; Leipzig, Electorate of Saxony
- Died: 21 February 1817 (aged 70–71) Vienna, Austrian Empire
- Allegiance: Kingdom of Prussia (Habsburg monarchy) Habsburg Austria; Austrian Empire
- Branch: Staff, Infantry
- Service years: Prussia: ?–1789; Austria: 1789–1809
- Rank: Feldzeugmeister
- Conflicts: French Revolutionary Wars; Napoleonic Wars
- Awards: Military Order of Maria Theresa, KC 1801
- Other work: Inhaber Infantry Regiment Nr. 29

Karl Friedrich von Lindenau (1746 – 21 February 1817) served in the Prussian army before an incident compelled him to switch allegiance to Habsburg Austria in 1789. A staff officer at the beginning of the French Revolutionary Wars, he was asked to mentor the young Archduke Charles, Duke of Teschen. The association with Charles lasted for the rest of Lindenau's military career. After being promoted to general officer in 1797, he led a brigade during the 1799 campaign and was elevated in rank to division commander. In 1803 he was appointed Proprietor (Inhaber) of an infantry regiment. In 1805 he fought with distinction while leading a grenadier division in Italy. The 1809 campaign found him leading an infantry division in Germany, after which he retired from active service.
