= Karl von Vincent =

- Born: 11 August 1757; Florence, Grand Duchy of Tuscany
- Died: 7 October 1834 (aged 77) Bioncourt, France
- Allegiance: Austrian Empire
- Branch: Cavalry
- Rank: General of Cavalry
- Conflicts: Brabant Revolution; French Revolutionary Wars; Napoleonic Wars
- Awards: Military Order of Maria Theresa, KC 1790, CC 1806; Order of Leopold, CC 1809, GC 1815; Order of Saint Stephen, GC 1825
- Other work: Inhaber Chevau-léger Regiment # 4 Privy Councillor, 1810

Karl Freiherr von Vincent (11 August 1757 – 7 October 1834) fought in the army of Habsburg Austria during the French Revolutionary Wars. He first served as a staff officer then later as a combat commander. During the Napoleonic Wars, he was given important commands in two campaigns. He was Proprietor (Inhaber) of a famous light cavalry regiment from 1806 until his death.

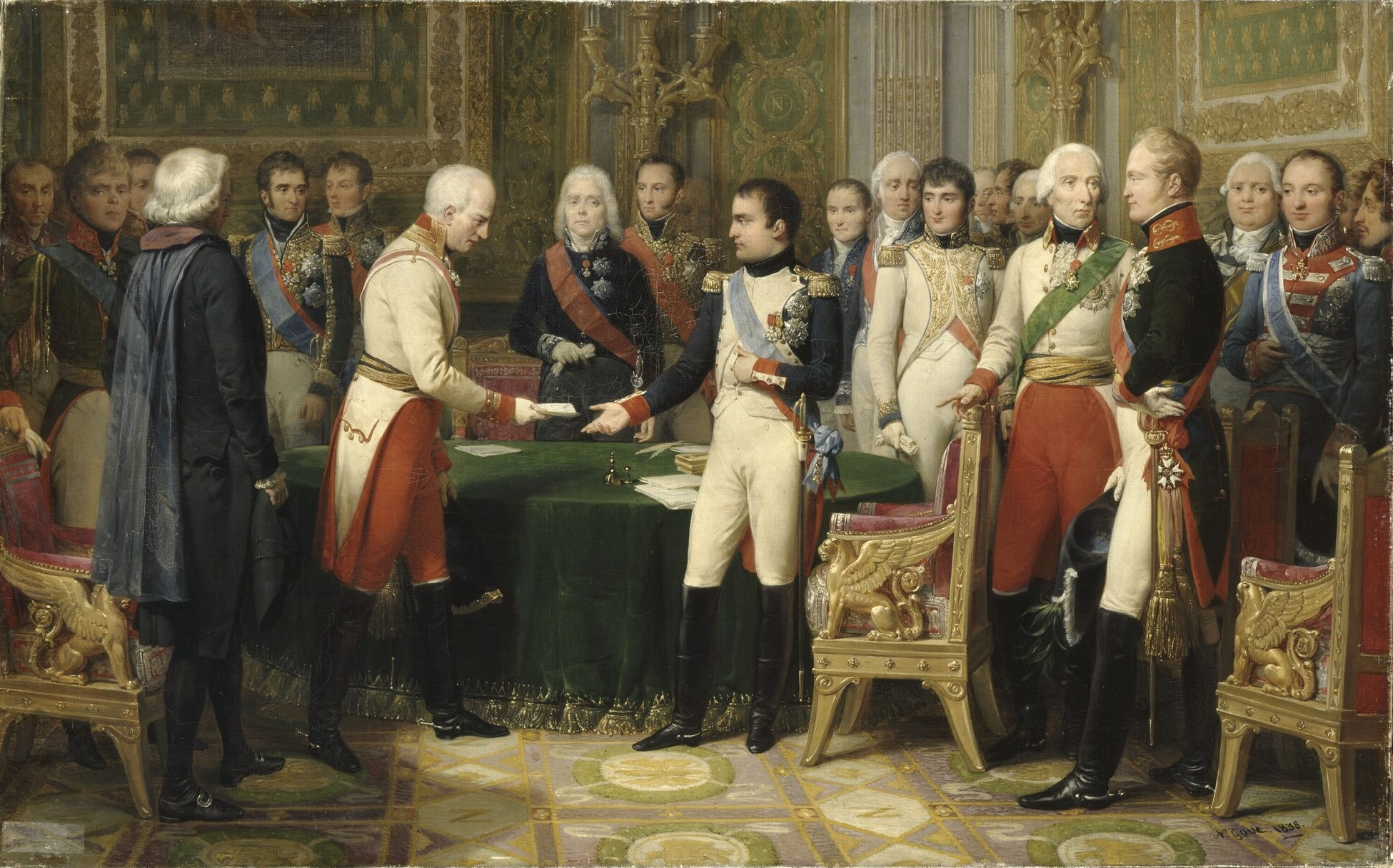
The Congress of Erfurt by Nicolas Gosse. Vincent represented Austria at the 1808 Congress of Erfurt and is shown being received by Napoleon

For his actions in putting down the Brabant Revolution of 1789 and 1790, he earned an important award. In the War of the First Coalition he was Aide-de-camp to two distinguished generals. During the War of the Second Coalition, he commanded a regiment, then a brigade. He led the rear guard during the 1805 campaign. He commanded a division through all the major battles of 1809. He was governor-general of Belgium in 1814, and was present at the Battle of Waterloo as an Austrian observer.

Between 1814 and 1826, von Vincent was the Austrian ambassador to France at the Tuileries during the shift in the European political equilibrium of 1820. He was also cited in an account describing Klemens von Metternich's proposals concerning the fate of Belgium. He was identified as a candidate in charge of its occupation but it was noted that his office was under the authority of Baron Stein's administrative department when it came to political matters and that he must also defer to the Dutch, English, and Prussians in the area of military affairs.

In 1825, he returned to Vienna after being retired from his post at his own request. He died at Bioncourt Lorraine on 7 October 1834.
