= Joseph, Baron von Mesko de Felsö-Kubiny =

Hungarian Habsburg general (1762–1815)

Joseph Mesko Freiherr von Felsö-Kubiny
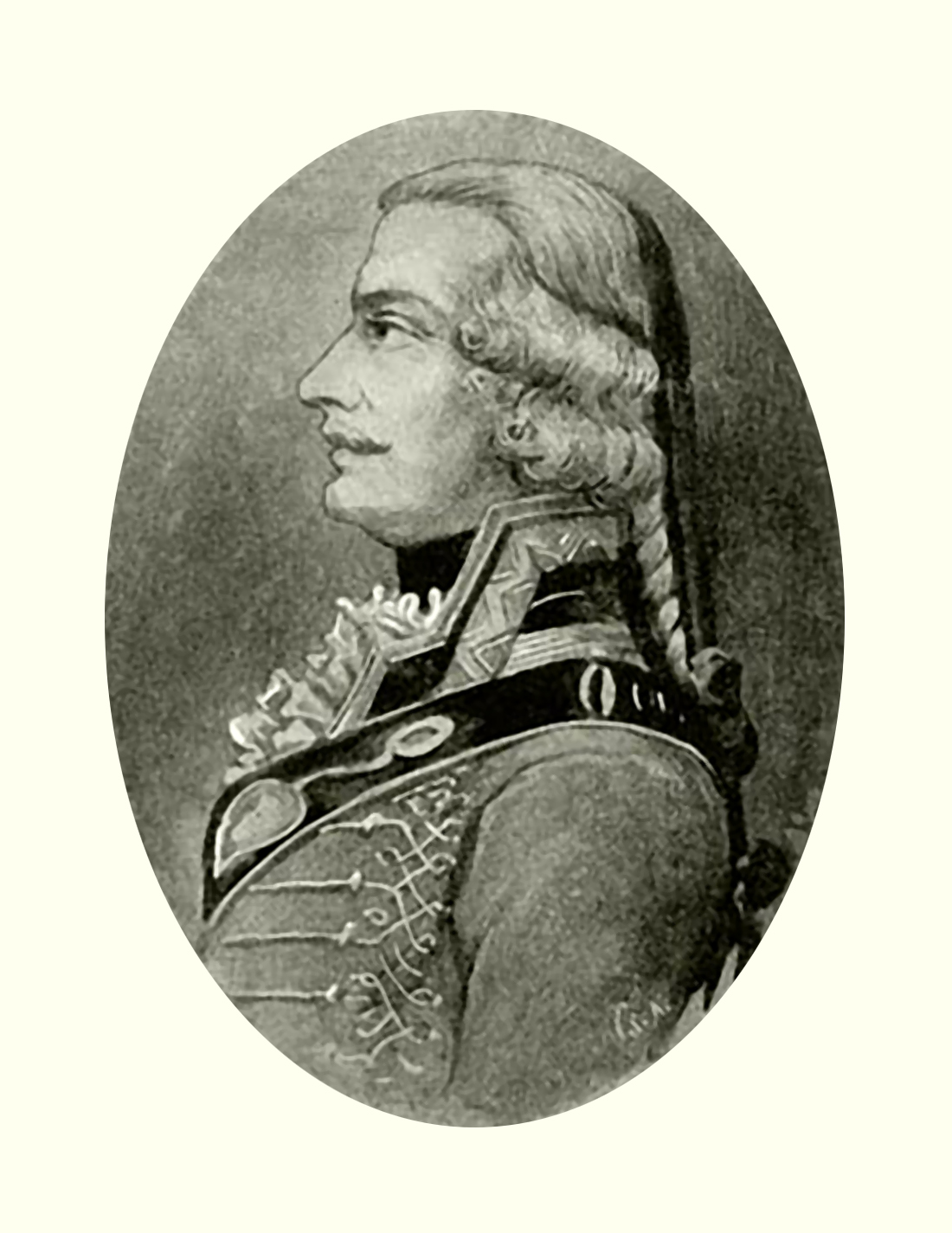
- Born: 28 January 1762 hu:Erdőtarcsa, Nógrád County, Hungary
- Died: 29 August 1815 (aged 53) Kőszeg, Hungary
- Allegiance: Habsburg monarchy
- Service years: 1797–1814
- Rank: Lieutenant-general
- Conflicts: French Revolutionary Wars; Napoleonic Wars
- Awards: • Knights Cross of the Military Order of Maria Theresa 8 August 1801 / • Commanders Cross of the Military Order of Maria Theresa 25 August 1809

Joseph de Mesko, Freiherr von Felsö-Kubiny (Hungarian: Felsőkubinyi báró Meskó József) was a cavalry general and lieutenant-general (Hungarian: altábornagy) in Habsburg service during the French Revolutionary and Napoleonic wars.

== Military service ==
In 1799, he fought as a Major in the Italian campaign during the War of the Second Coalition, in particular in the actions on the Po River. In September 1800, he was promoted to Lieutenant Colonel and in the next month to Colonel. The following year, Mesko was awarded the Knight's Cross of the Military Order of Maria Theresa.

In the war of Third Coalition (1805), he commanded a garrison in upper Styria. He was promoted to Major General. At the Battle of Raab, on 14 June, he was completely cut off, with 5,000 men and 10 guns, in the redoubts between the Rába and the Rabnitzbach rivers. In the following two days, he repelled repeated French attacks and even managed to take seven officers and 300 men as prisoner. On 16 June, he also freed a convoy of 36 Austrian officers and 500 men, when he ambushed their French captors at Kis-Szél. On 25 August 1809, he was awarded the Commander's Cross of the Military Order of Maria Theresa.

In 1813, as lieutenant-general, he commanded a division in General of Cavalry Johann von Klenau's IV Corps on the Army of Bohemia. At the Battle of Dresden, on 26 August, his division was cut off on the left wing when the river Weißeritz flooded. Attacked by Marie Victor de Fay, Marquis de Latour-Maubourg's cavalry corps, which, under Joachim Murat, forced him to surrender his division and 15 colors after a hard fight. A French participant observed, "Murat, who commanded this part of the French line, showed himself more brilliant than ever; for after forcing the defile of Cotta, he turned and cut off from the Austrian army Klenau's corps, hurling himself upon it at the head of the carabineers and cuirassiers. His movement was decisive; Klenau could not resist that terrible charge. Nearly all his battalions were compelled to lay down their arms, and two other divisions of infantry shared their fate." Mesko was severely wounded in the action and retired in September 1814. He died in Güns (Kőszeg), in Hungary, southwest of the Neusiedler See, on 29 August 1815.

Promotions

- Major: 31 August 1797
- Lt. Colonel: 15 September 1800
- Colonel: 26 November 1800
- Major General: 23 June 1808 (effective 13 August 1805)
- Lieutenant-general: 7 July 1813

== Sources ==
=== Sources ===
- Marbot, Jean-Baptiste Antoine Marcellin. The Memoirs of General Baron De Marbot, Volume II, Chapter 23. Electronic book widely available.

=== External Links (Sources) ===
- Smith, Digby. Mesko Leopold Kudrna and Digby Smith (compilers). A biographical dictionary of all Austrian Generals in the French Revolutionary and Napoleonic Wars, 1792–1815. Napoleon Series, Robert Burnham, editor in chief. April 2008 version. Retrieved 8 December 2009.
