= Étienne Marie Antoine Champion de Nansouty =

French cavalry commander during the French Revolutionary Wars

Étienne-Marie-Antoine Champion de Nansouty
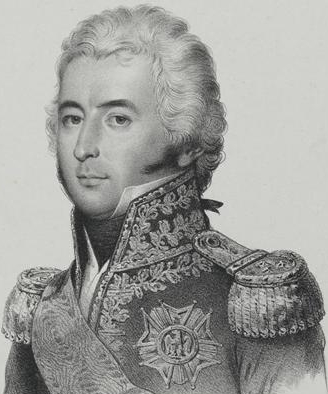
- General Count Nansouty
- Born: 30 May 1768; Bordeaux, France
- Died: 12 February 1815 (aged 46); Paris, France
- Burial place: Père Lachaise Cemetery, Paris
- Military career
- Allegiance: Kingdom of France; Kingdom of France; French First Republic; First French Empire; Bourbon Restoration
- Branch: Cavalry
- Service years: 1785–1814
- Rank: General of Division
- Commands: 9th Cavalry Regt (1793–1799), 8th and 9th Cavalry Regts (1799–1800), 15th Cavalry, 11th Dragoon and 12th Chasseur Regts (1800), 1st Heavy Cavalry Division (1804–1807, 1809), I Cavalry Corps (1812), Guard Cavalry (1813–1814).
- Conflicts: French Revolutionary Wars, Napoleonic Wars
- Awards: Count de Nansouty and of the Empire, Légion d'honneur (Commander, then Grand Officer, then Grand Eagle), Order of Saint Louis (Knight), Order of Notre-Dame du Mont-Carmel (Knight), Royal Order of the Golden Eagle of Württemberg (Grand Cross), Name inscribed under the Arc de Triomphe.
- Other work: Chamberlain of the Empress, First Squire of the Emperor, General Inspector of Cavalry, Colonel-General of Dragoons, General Inspector of Dragoons, Lt.-General of the King's Armies, Captain-Lt. of the 1st company of Musketeers of the King's Guard, Aide-de-camp to Comte d'Artois

Étienne-Marie-Antoine Champion, comte de Nansouty (French pronunciation: [etjɛn maʁi ɑ̃twan ʃɑ̃pjɔ̃ kɔ̃t də nɑ̃suti]; 30 May 1768 – 12 February 1815) was a French cavalry commander during the French Revolutionary Wars who rose to the rank of General of Division in 1803 and subsequently held important military commands during the Napoleonic Wars.

Of noble Burgundian descent, he was a student at the Brienne military school, then was a graduate of the Paris military school. Nansouty began his military career in 1785, as a sub-lieutenant in the regiment Bourgogne-Infanterie, where his father had served during the wars of Louis XV. A cavalry officer at the outbreak of the French Revolutionary Wars in 1792, Nansouty was commissioned as an aide-de-camp to Marshal Nicolas Luckner. During the First Coalition, he saw service as a lieutenant-colonel and squadron commander in the 9th (heavy) Cavalry Regiment, campaigning with the French armies on the Rhine and in Germany. Promoted to colonel in 1793 and given the command of the 9th Cavalry, he was noted for several well-led cavalry actions. Finally made a brigadier general in 1799, after he had refused the promotion several times in the past, Nansouty fought the next year under General Jean Victor Moreau in southern Germany, in a decisive campaign of the Second Coalition.

Promoted to the top military rank of General of Division in 1803, Nansouty was called to the command of the 1st Heavy Cavalry Division in Emperor Napoleon I's newly created Grande Armée. Commanding this division from 1804 to 1809, Nansouty was present at some of the most significant battles of the Third, Fourth and Fifth coalitions, leading cavalry actions at the battles of Austerlitz, Friedland, Eckmühl, Aspern-Essling and Wagram. In 1812, during the campaign in Russia, Nansouty commanded the I Cavalry Corps, which he led with distinction at such battles as Ostrovno and Borodino, where he received a severe knee wound. The next year, he commanded the Imperial Guard cavalry, which he led at Dresden, Leipzig and Hanau, where he was again wounded. In 1814 he led his men in several engagements, including La Rothière, Montmirail, Vauchamps and Craonne until his incapacitation from wounds that year.

A member of the military elite of the First French Empire and a recipient of the Grand Aigle de la Légion d'Honneur, Comte de Nansouty was a member of the Military Household of the Emperor as First Squire of the Emperor, and also held the position of Colonel-General of Dragoons. During the Bourbon Restoration, Louis XVIII awarded him additional honours and commands, including one in the Military Household of the King of France. Nansouty died in February 1815 and is buried at the Père Lachaise Cemetery in Paris. His name is inscribed on the Arc de Triomphe and a street in the 14th arrondissement of Paris is named after him.

== Early life ==
Étienne de Nansouty was born on 30 May 1768 in Bordeaux. His father had served France for fifty years in Louis XV's wars of the Polish Succession and Austrian Succession and the Seven Years' War, and had subsequently been appointed "major" (commander) of the Château-Trompette fortress in Bordeaux. Typically for a member of the minor nobility of the Ancien Régime, young Étienne de Nansouty chose to follow his father's footsteps in the military. He was admitted at the military school of Brienne-le-Château in 1779, aged ten, where he was noted for being a well-behaved and assiduous student. On 21 October 1782, he transferred to the École Militaire in Paris, where he obtained excellent grades. Two years later, Nansouty became a Chevalier (Knight) of the Order Notre-Dame-du-Mont-Carmel and had the honour of being decorated by Monsieur, the future King Louis XVIII, in person. Upon his graduation on 30 May 1783, he was appointed sub-lieutenant and, on 26 May 1785, Nansouty was sent to the Bourgogne-Infanterie regiment, where his father had served with distinction.

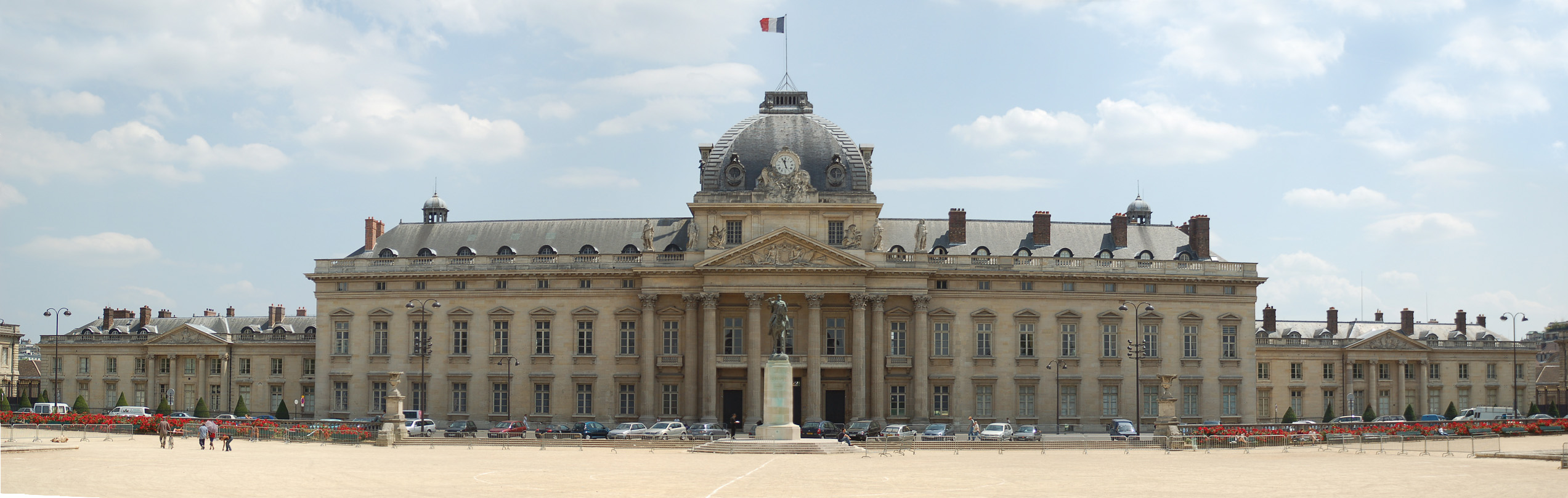
A modern photo of the École Militaire in Paris. As a young cadet, Nansouty studied there, before becoming a junior officer in 1783.

Throughout his childhood and youth, the Nansouty family led a tranquil yet modest life in Bordeaux, where his father held the position of commander of Château-Trompette, in which he lived with his family, additionally receiving a pension of 1000 livres. He was still holding the position as commander when he died suddenly in 1785, after more than 60 years of active service. His widow had no revenue with which to raise their son and two daughters. However, influential people such as the Duchess of Brancas and the wife of Marshal Beauvau contacted the Minister of War, Marshal de Ségur, regarding the situation of the young Nansouty. As a result, in 1788, Nansouty was named interim captain in the light cavalry Franche-Comté Cavalerie Regiment (later rebaptised 4th Chasseurs à Cheval). He was soon transferred to the Lauzun Hussar Regiment (which became the 6th Hussars in 1791, then the 5th Hussars in 1793). In 1791, Nansouty then left the regiment to fill two consecutive military staff positions, first as deputy aid to Adjutant General Poncet de la Cour Maupas in the Army of the centre on 20 December, then as aide-de-camp of Marshal Luckner at the beginning of 1792. He was then promoted to lieutenant-colonel and took up the command of a squadron of the 2nd Chasseurs à Cheval (on 5 March), before being transferred to the command of a squadron of the 9th Cavalry Regiment on 4 April, a regiment in which he would serve for the next seven and a half years.

== Revolutionary Wars ==
=== War of the First Coalition ===
==== Officer in the 9th Cavalry ====
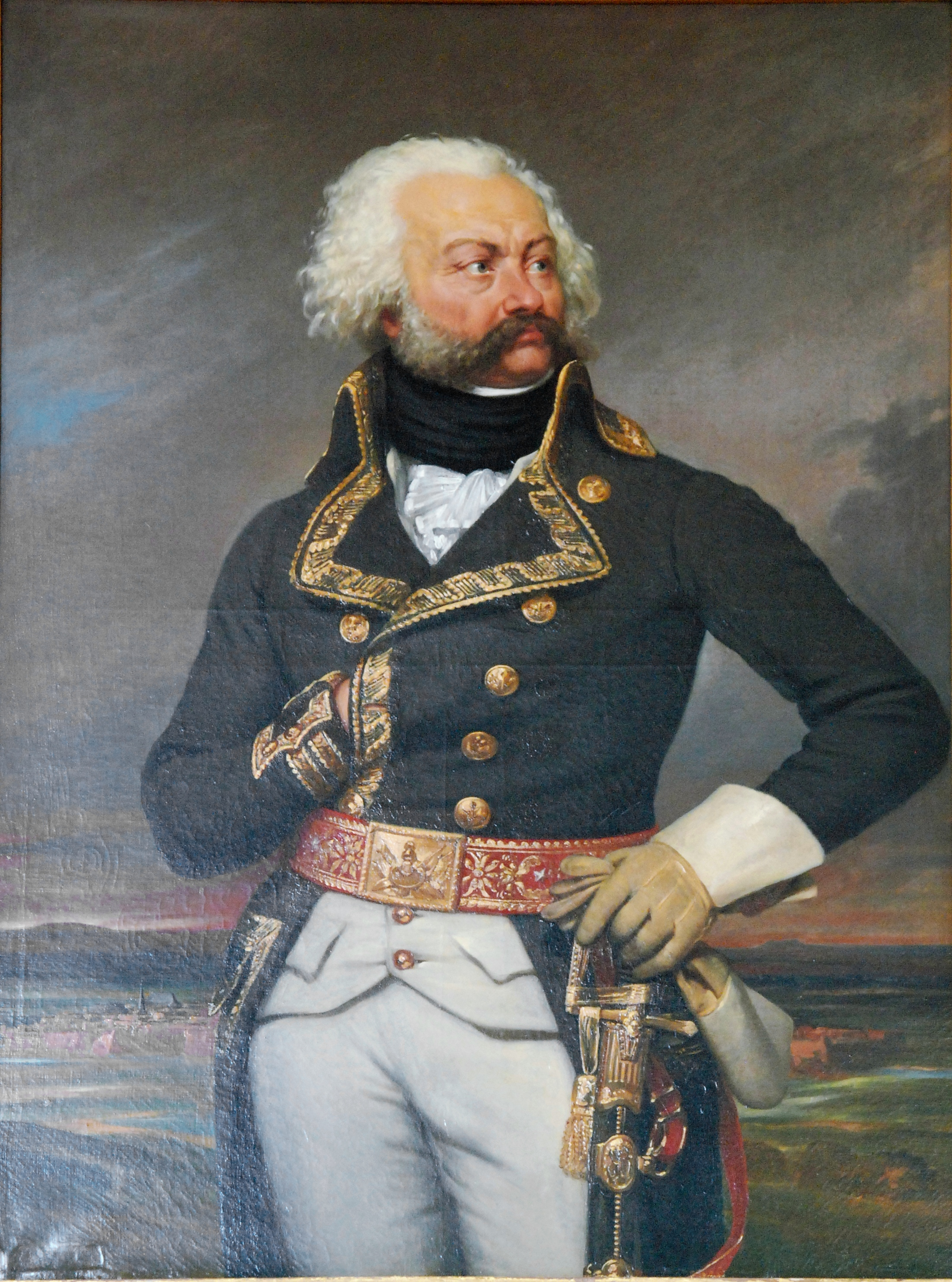
A portrait of General Adam Philippe de Custine by Joseph-Désiré Court. Nansouty saw military action for the first time as a young lieutenant-colonel of the 9th Cavalry Regiment, in Custine's Corps of the "Army of the Rhine".

As the French Revolutionary Wars broke out, Nansouty soon found himself in the position of having to take provisional command of the whole 9th Cavalry Regiment, as he was the most senior chef d'escadron (Lieutenant-Colonel) of the regiment when the commander, Colonel Badda de Bodosalva, fell ill at the end of May 1792. His regiment was a part of the "Army of the Rhine" and was integrated in General Custine's Corps, which was to march towards the Palatinate, where the first military manoeuvres took place. As Colonel Badda de Bodosalva died at the end of October that year, Nansouty naturally expected to be appointed commander of the regiment in his place. However, Custine appointed the more senior Lieutenant-Colonel Loubat de Bohan as commander of the 9th Cavalry and, despite Nansouty's protestations, maintained his decision. With Loubat in command, the 9th saw action against the Prussians in an engagement at Ober-Flörsheim on 30 March 1793. After a first successful charge, Nansouty's 1st squadron was counter-charged by enemy hussars; the remaining squadrons under Loubat quickly caught up with Nansouty's squadron and together they broke the enemy. Corps commander Custine was then called up to command the Army of the North but, before leaving his command, he attempted a last daunting move against the Habsburg army. This required a night march, not usually undertaken by cavalry, and poorly coordinated manoeuvres of cavalry, infantry and artillery. This led to total failure of the action of 17 May. During this action, though, the initial charge of the corps cavalry, which included the 9th, successfully took a number of enemy guns. However, a Habsburg counter-charge forced them back in disorder, which spread panic among the ranks of oncoming infantry.

Despite this setback, a few days later, Lobat de Bohan was promoted to the rank of General and Nansouty again took provisional command of the regiment. When General Alexandre de Beauharnais took command of the Army of the Rhine, he directed his troops towards Mainz. Some fighting took place near Landau and the 9th Cavalry charged several times. Just after this event, the commander of the 2nd Squadron of the regiment invoked the provision of an equivocal new law, demanding that he be given command of the regiment instead of Nansouty. His request was rejected and Nansouty's provisional command was confirmed.

==== Commander of the 9th Cavalry ====
Now holding the rank of chef de brigade (colonel) in command of the 9th Cavalry Regiment, Nansouty took part in several successful cavalry skirmishes around Strasbourg in November and December 1793. He then participated to the Battle of Geisberg, at the end of December. Following this battle, General of Division Donnadieu, who had commanded the cavalry division of which Nansouty's regiment was a part, was tried and executed for alleged cowardice in front of the enemy. Nansouty was not involved in the incident. Furthermore, despite being a member of the Ancien Régime nobility, he was not harassed at any time during the radical phase of the French Revolution.

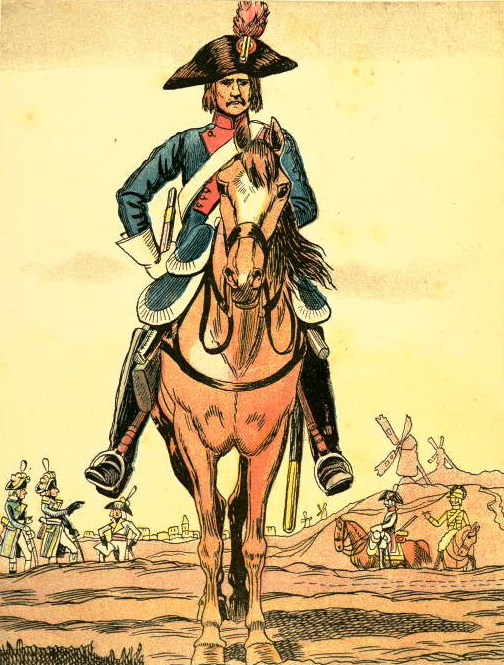
A French Revolutionary heavy cavalryman in 1795. Nansouty was in command of the 9th Cavalry from 1793 to 1799.

During the campaigns of 1794, war continued in the Rhineland, with General Louis Desaix pushing back the Coalition forces. Nansouty's 9th Cavalry was brigaded together with the 17th Dragoon Regiment, with General Delmas de La Coste as commander. The brigade performed well against Austrian cavalry in two distinct actions at the end of May of that year. General of Division Michaud, the commander-in-chief of France's Army of the Rhine, noted in his report that Delmas's two regiments showed bravery and intrepidity every time they faced the enemy. In July, the 9th Cavalry was involved in several well-led cavalry actions and Nansouty acquired an excellent reputation, recognised as a disciplinarian and a commander who knew how to drill his men effectively.

Beginning in December 1794, the French forces on the Rhine experienced a difficult period, marked by General Charles Pichegru's inability to take Mainz. General Jean Victor Marie Moreau replaced him as commander-in-chief. Moreau reorganised the army into three corps, plus a reserve, of which the 9th Cavalry was a part. The Reserve Cavalry, under Bourcier, intervened at the Battle of Ettlingen, with two squadrons of the 9th being committed and behaving most honourably. The next significant moment of this campaign was the incident that occurred at dawn on 11 August 1796, while Nansouty and his men were temporarily attached to the "Corps of the Centre", under General Laurent de Gouvion Saint-Cyr. Gouvion Saint-Cyr's cavalry exhausted after several days of continuous marching, it was decided that a squadron of the fresher Carabiniers-à-Cheval would be posted as sentry, an unusual duty for such an elite heavy cavalry unit. At daybreak, as the Battle of Neresheim opened, Austrian cavalry charged the carabiniers, stunning the unprepared cavalrymen, who fled in panic. Their precipitate flight spread alarm among the ranks of the other cavalry regiments, who were used to seeing the Carabiniers-à-Cheval triumph against the enemy on every occasion. Nansouty did his best to stop the rout of the cavalrymen and to reorganise the other panic-stricken regiments, but the morale of the cavalrymen remained very low throughout the day and Nansouty was forced to give ground in front of the enemy rather than attempt a risky charge with his demoralised troops. This elicited criticism from the Corps commander, General Gouvion Saint-Cyr, who sent his aide-de-camp to Nansouty with orders to charge, which the latter did after taking the necessary time to deploy his men. Under his direction, the four cavalry regiments (2nd and 20th Chasseurs à Cheval and 2nd and 9th Cavalry Regiments), executed a superb charge, which halted the advance of the Austrian first infantry line. The next day, Archduke Charles of Austria retreated from the field. Nansouty's 9th Cavalry had numerous other opportunities to shine during the campaign of 1796 and rose to the occasion every time. He became very fond of his regiment and refused the promotion to brigadier general several times, preferring to remain colonel of the 9th cavalry.

=== War of the Second Coalition ===
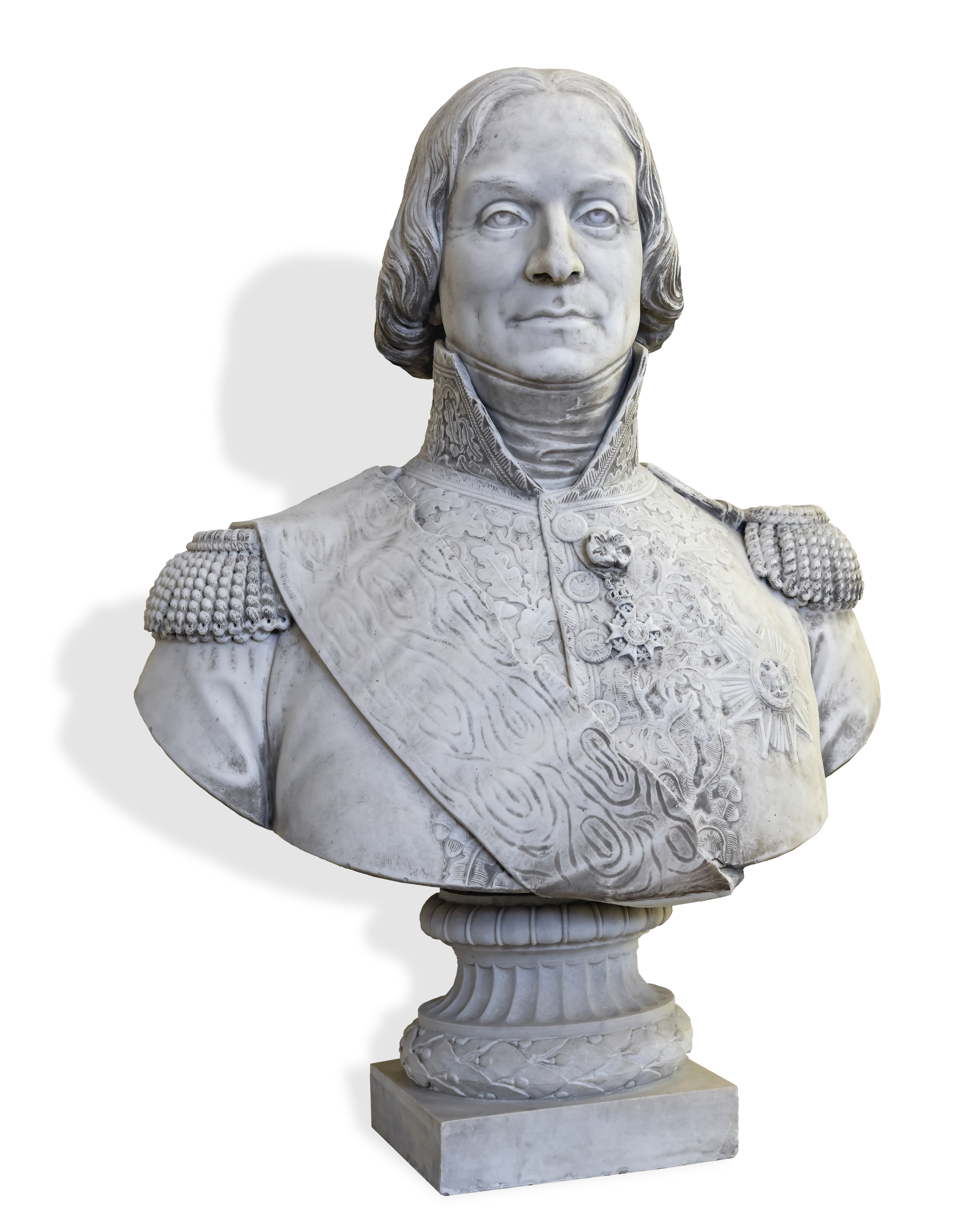
The seasoned General of Division Jean-Joseph d'Hautpoul, Nansouty's direct commander in 1799

The signature of the Treaty of Campo Formio in October 1797 marked the end of the War of the First Coalition but the fleeting period of peace ended in 1798, with the formation of the Second Coalition against the French Republic. Nansouty's 9th Cavalry Regiment was successively attached to the Armies "of Germany", "of Mainz" and then to the "Army of the Danube", under the command of Jean-Baptiste Jourdan. In 1799, the regiment, with Nansouty commanding it, was integrated into General of Division Jean-Joseph Ange d'Hautpoul's Cavalry Reserve of the "Army of the Danube". This army was sharply defeated at the Battle of Stockach and most of its units merged with General André Masséna's "Army of Switzerland"; the cavalry was sent to the newly formed "Army of the Rhine".

In 1799, France's political and military situation seemed perilous, especially after the losses in southwestern Germany culminating in the Battle at Stockach. By then a colonel, Nansouty accepted the promotion to brigadier general on 29 August and was given the command of a heavy cavalry brigade formed by the 8th and 9th Cavalry Regiments. Later, Nansouty's brigade was provisionally augmented to four regiments, which, alongside Brigadier General Jean-Louis-Brigitte Espagne's four regiments, was included in a 3,000-man-strong Cavalry Reserve (the 1st and 2nd Carabiniers-à-Cheval and the 6th, 8th, 9th, 10th, 19th and 23rd Cavalry Regiments, with 14 cannons), under the command of the 45-year-old General d'Hautpoul. Overall command of the "Army of the Rhine" was given to the promising General Claude Lecourbe. Lecourbe believed his forces to be insufficient for offensive action, so he decided to fall back. During the retreat, a cavalry combat took place during the Battle of Wiesloch, where d'Hautpoul's men, and Nansouty's brigade in particular, were heavily engaged. With operations on the Rhine coming to an end, Lecourbe was replaced at the head of the army by Louis Baraguey d'Hilliers, who reorganised d'Hautpoul's Cavalry Reserve, reducing Nansouty's brigade to its initial strength of two regiments (the 8th and 9th Cavalry).

==== Campaign in Germany ====
Despite the improvement of the military situation on its borders, France remained in political turmoil. Upon his return from the campaign in Egypt, General Napoleon Bonaparte received a hero's welcome and was regarded by many as the saviour of France. Enjoying wide popular support and political backing, Bonaparte and his followers staged a coup and installed the French Consulate. Then, First Consul Bonaparte immediately drew up campaign plans against France's only remaining continental enemy, Austria. Nansouty was first called to serve in the First Consul's "Army of the Reserve" that was to operate in Italy, but General Jean Victor Marie Moreau insisted on retaining him in his own "Army of the Rhine", which was to operate in central Germany. Consequently, Nansouty received command of the cavalry (15th Cavalry, 11th Dragoons and 12th Chasseurs à Cheval) of Lecourbe's "Right Wing Corps" of the "Army of the Rhine".

Nansouty's cavalry took part in several actions, beginning with the Battle of Engen, where the commander was noted for his able and daring manoeuvres, subsequently leading a successful charge against enemy infantry, whom he chased through the streets of the nearby city of Stockach, the locale of the French Army of the Danube's defeat a year earlier. He patrolled the Tyrol and there repulsed Prince Reuss-Plauen's forces in an action fought on 14 June 1800, the day when First Consul Napoleon Bonaparte was winning at Marengo further to the south. Nansouty served as a commander of an autonomous unit in the Tyrol until the end of the War of the Second Coalition, then under the successive command of Generals Molitor and Gudin. Nansouty's command included as many as five regiments, after the 6th and 8th Hussars were attached to his force. During this time, he enhanced his solid reputation as an able and adept cavalry commander; General Lecourbe stated that he wanted nobody else at the helm of his cavalry.

== Years of peace ==
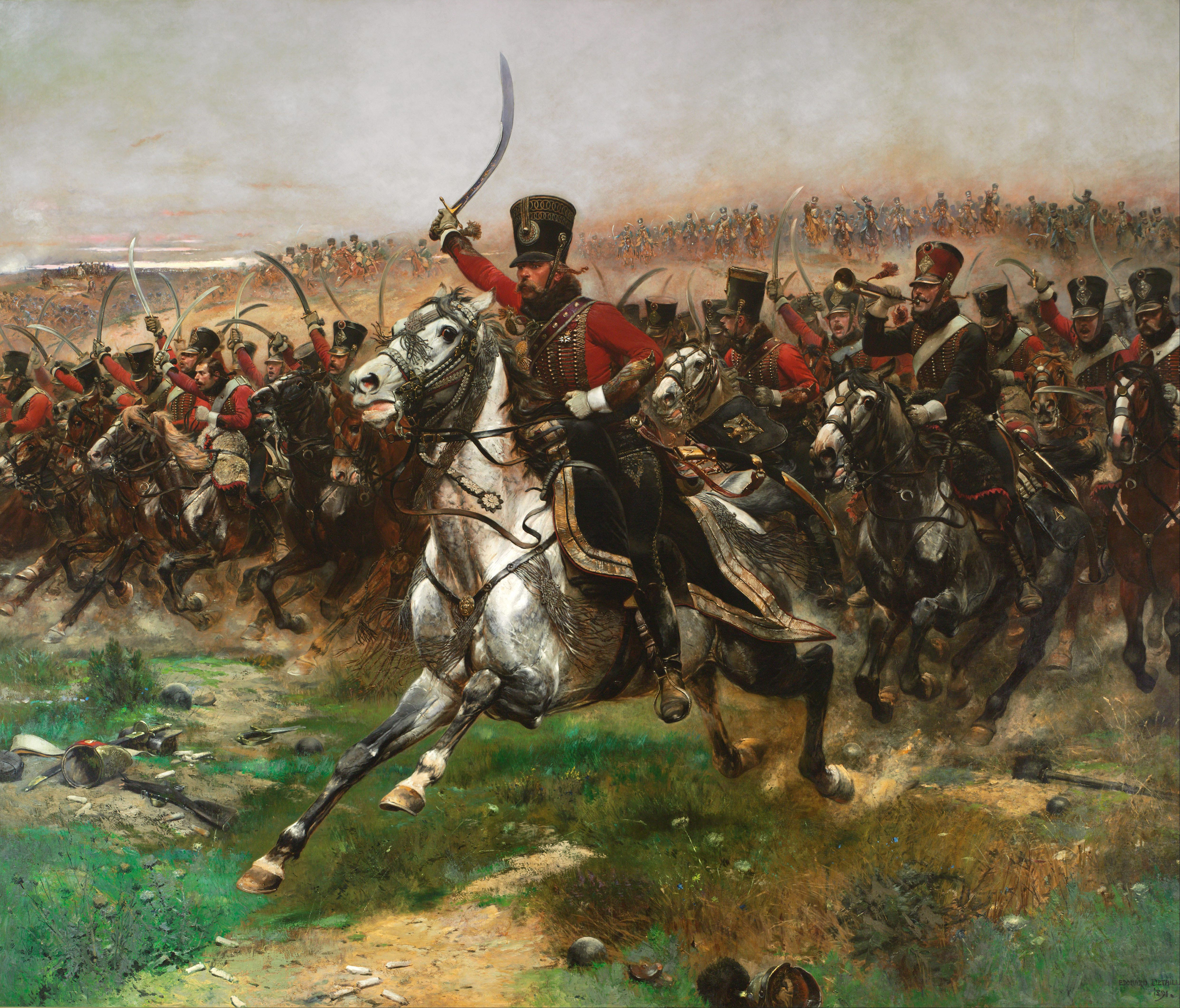
The 4th Hussars Regiment. This regiment was a part of Nansouty's division in 1803.

The signing of the Treaty of Lunéville initiated a period of peace on the European continent. Meanwhile, however, with the Kingdom of Portugal allied to the Kingdom of Great Britain, First Consul Napoleon Bonaparte decided to make a military demonstration against the Lusitanian nation. He ordered the creation of the "Observation Corps of the Gironde". Chosen from a short list of nine men, Nansouty was named commander of the Corps cavalry. With orders to invade Portugal the "Observation Corps of the Gironde" entered Spanish territory, but it soon returned to France, after a treaty of peace was agreed with the Portuguese government. Nansouty then held various commands, before being named general of division on 24 March 1803. He was 35 years old. A military commander in the department of Seine-et-Oise, he was then sent to command the cavalry (5th Chasseurs à Cheval, 2nd, 4th and 5th Hussar Regiments) of General Édouard Mortier's "Army of Hanover", a position that he held until the Hanoverian Army was disarmed and the French occupied the city.

On 1 February 1804, Nansouty was called to a command in the cavalry reserve of the "Army of the Ocean coast". The reform of the French cavalry arm had already begun in September 1803, reorganising the first twelve regiments of heavy cavalry of the French Revolutionary army into regiments of cuirassiers. The reforms also established a powerful 6-regiment heavy cavalry division, comprising the 1st and 2nd Carabiniers-à-Cheval, 2nd, 3rd, 9th and 12th Cuirassiers, with command given to Nansouty. On 29 August 1805 this division was renamed the 1st heavy cavalry division of the newly created Grande Armée. Nansouty was also named Commander of the Legion of Honour on 14 June 1804. In 1805, Napoleon appointed him as First Chamberlain of the Empress, but Nansouty disliked Court life and resigned from the position as soon as he was able to find an acceptable excuse.

== Napoleonic Wars ==
=== War of the Third Coalition ===
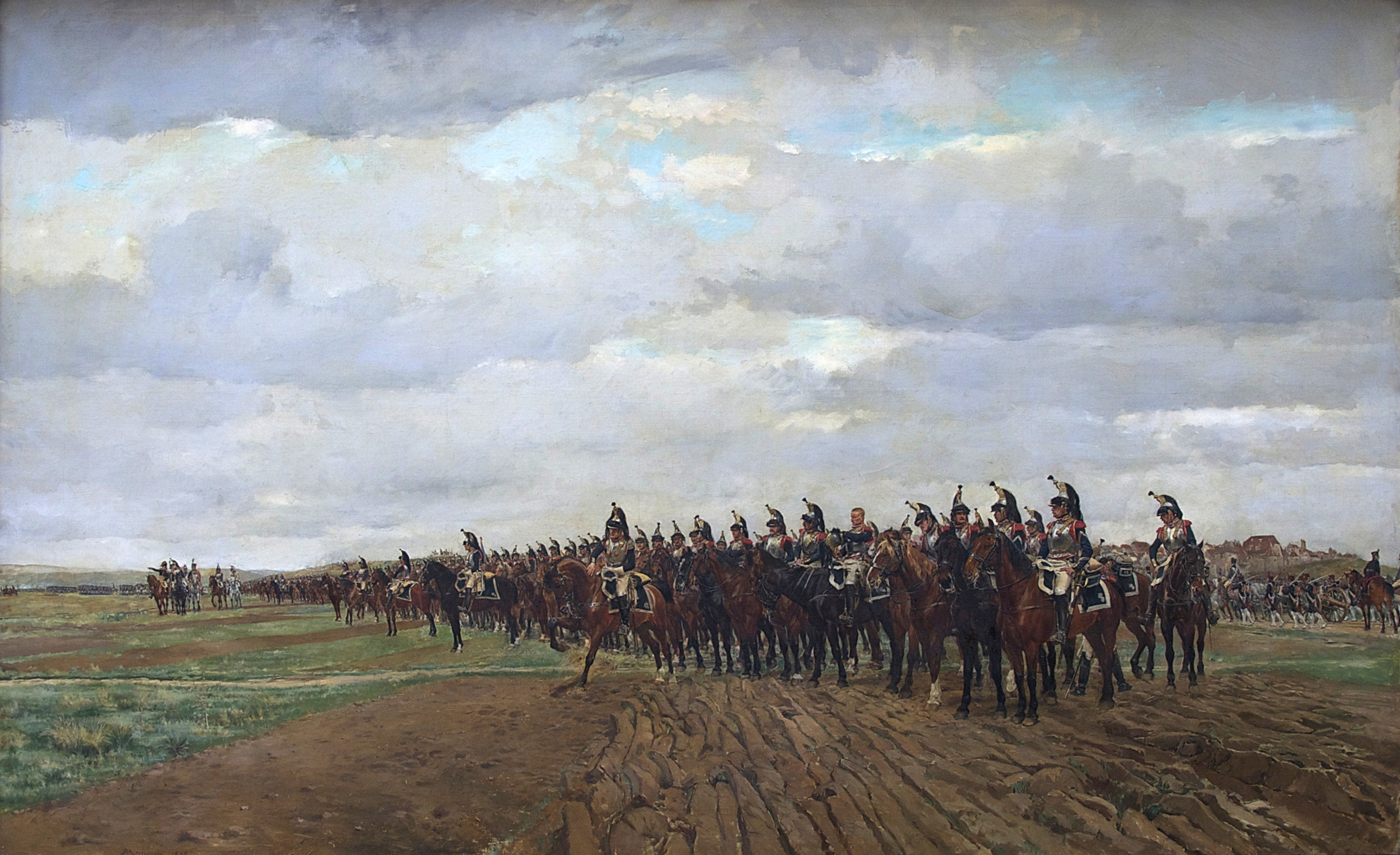
French cuirassiers preparing for a charge in 1805. Nansouty commanded cuirassiers in several actions throughout the campaigns of the War of the Third Coalition that year. Painting by Jean-Louis-Ernest Meissonier.

At the outbreak of the War of the Third Coalition, a cavalry reserve corps was organised in the Grande Armée, with command given to Marshal Joachim Murat. This cavalry reserve included Nansouty's heavy cavalry division, another heavy cavalry division under Jean-Joseph d'Hautpoul, three dragoon divisions, a foot dragoon division and a light cavalry brigade. Nansouty's six-regiment division soon acquired the reputation of being the best administered and most exact in its manoeuvres.

During the initial phase of the campaign, Nansouty's division was at first attached to Marshal Louis Nicolas Davout's III Corps, with which it crossed the Rhine and then the Danube, before rejoining Murat's cavalry reserve. Nansouty had a first opportunity to lead his men into combat at the Battle of Wertingen, where his men were noted for their excellent manoeuvring. Detaching his two Carabiniers-à-Cheval regiments, which he had to leave with Murat, Nansouty and his reduced division followed the Emperor at Augsburg, where he was attached to Marshal Jean Lannes's V Corps. In this capacity, they supported Walther's division at the Battle of Schöngrabern. Then, at the Battle of Wischau on 25 November 1805, the 9th Cuirassiers participated in a major cavalry action, alongside d'Hautpoul's cuirassier division, Walther's dragoons and Bessières's Grenadiers à Cheval and Chasseurs à Cheval of the Guard cavalry.

==== Charge at Austerlitz ====
Having advanced the bulk of his army deep into Austrian territory, Napoleon faced a massed enemy army of some 85,000 men in the vicinity of the town of Austerlitz. Combat began before dawn on 2 December 1805, and Nansouty had his entire division reunited under his command and again placed in the Cavalry Reserve, under Murat. Nansouty was positioned on the left wing of the army and his command included his usual six regiments of three-squadrons each: Brigadier General Piston's 1st and 2nd Carabiniers-à-Cheval (205 and 181 men respectively), Brigadier General La Housaye's 2nd and 9th Cuirassiers (304 and 280 men respectively) and Brigadier General Saint-Germain's 3rd and 12th Cuirassiers (333 and 277 men respectively). Additionally, a horse battery from the 4th company of the 2nd horse artillery regiment was also a part of his division. These men were at first positioned on two lines, behind Caffarelli's infantry division of Lannes's V Corps.

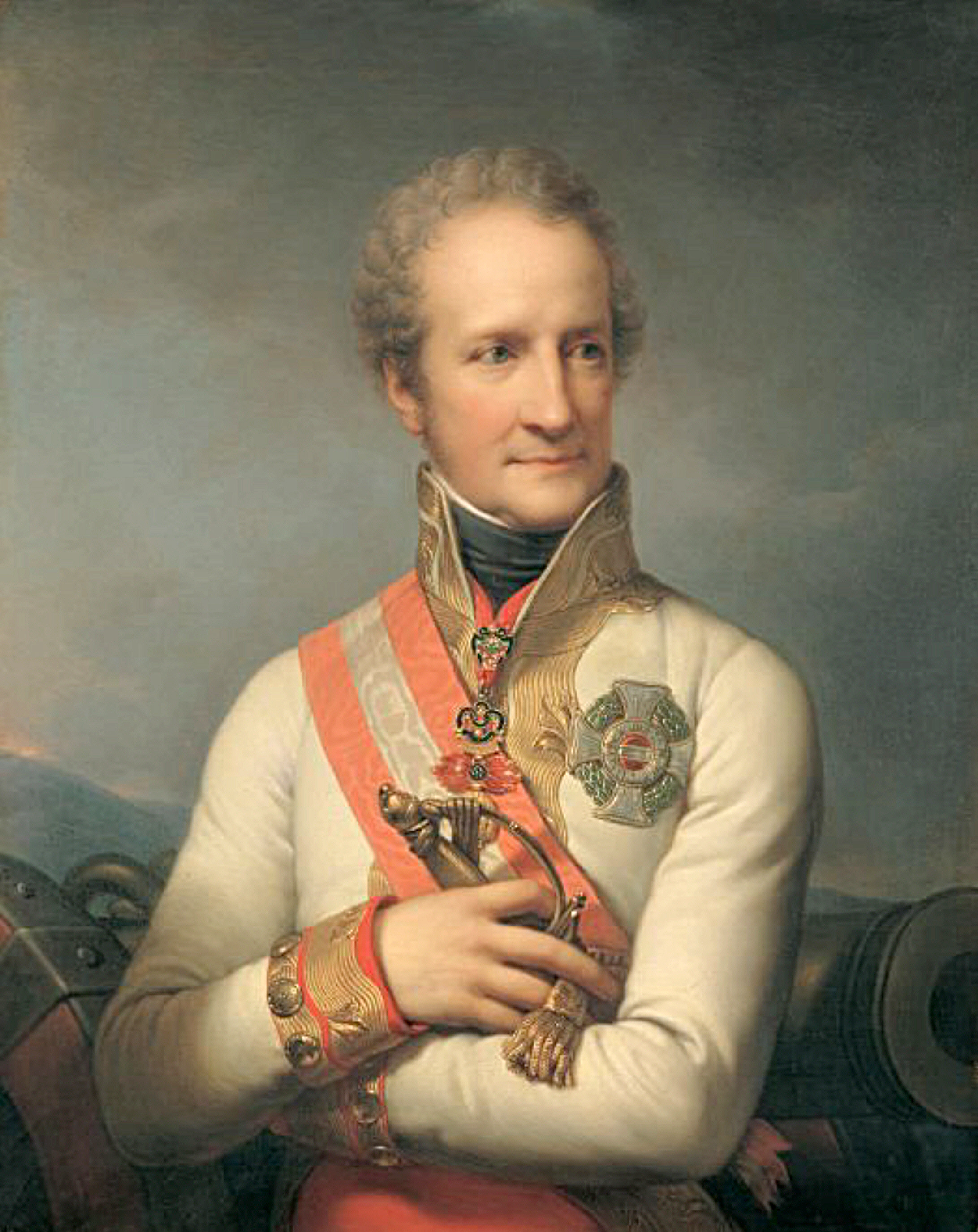
The Austrian Prince Johann Josef I von Liechtenstein was in command of the cavalry reserve of the Austro-Russian army at Austerlitz. During this battle, his men came off worst from a series of encounters with Nansouty's 1st heavy cavalry division.

At around 10:00, after battle had been joined all along the front, Russian General Pyotr Bagration, who had won the cavalry action a few days earlier at Wissau, pulled his forces back from the advancing enemy infantry from the V Corps. Meanwhile, the Austrian Prince Johann I Joseph, Prince of Liechtenstein threw his 4,000-sabre Austro-Russian cavalry reserve into combat against Murat's 6,000 sabres. The Austro-Russians did not provide infantry or artillery support to the cavalry attack, while Murat's cavalrymen were able to cooperate with Lannes's infantry and artillery. Taking immense casualties after a first series of actions against Lannes's infantry, elements of the Coalition cavalry withdrew and were reformed by their commanders. Joined by Bagration's own cavalry, they set off again, this time aiming directly at Murat's command centre. As the Austro-Russian cavalry was closing in on its target, they were steadily met by four of Nansouty's regiments (the two Carabiniers regiments and the 2nd and 3rd Cuirassiers). The sounds of the two massed cavalries colliding could be heard some distance away. After a brief combat, the Austro-Russian horsemen broke and were driven off. However, Liechtenstein soon reformed his men and, seeing that all the French cavalry was positioned on the left of Caffarelli's infantry division, he launched his men against the right wing of this division, but was instantly met with sustained musket volleys that disorganised his cavalrymen. Seeing this development, Nansouty wheeled right with his men and crossed the infantry intervals by platoons, and then formed his men on two battle lines in front of the infantry. Three charges ensued in brief succession, with Nansouty skilfully committing the 1st and 2nd Carabiniers-à-Cheval and the 2nd Cuirassiers from his first line, then the 9th Cuirassiers and Saint-Germain's brigade from his second line. The Austro-Russian cavalry was finally broken and repulsed for good. After another series of well-coordinated cavalry and infantry actions, Murat and Lannes were able to force Bagration's entire force to withdraw, with a loss 2,000 men (approximately half of the force) and 16 guns.

On the French side, despite their repeated charges on this day, the 1st heavy cavalry division registered only relatively minor casualties, a testament to the skill of its commanders. Piston's 1st Brigade registered 2 killed and 41 wounded, La Houssaye's 2nd Brigade registered 1 man killed and 25 wounded, while Saint-Germain's 3rd Brigade registered 47 killed and 28 wounded. The regiment that suffered the highest casualty rate was by far the 3rd cuirassiers, with 44 killed and 27 wounded, for a casualty rate of 21 per cent. Nansouty's charge was rated "superb and brilliant" in the report drawn up by General Augustin Daniel Belliard, Murat's chief of staff, and Nansouty was subsequently mentioned in the army bulletin for this action and named Grand Officier de la Légion d'honneur on 25 December. Additionally, of the six colonels in his division, three were promoted to Brigadier General and three received the cross of Commandeur de la Légion d'honneur. Following the peace of Pressburg with the Austrian Empire in late December 1805, Nansouty's division was stationed in Bavaria, where they took winter quarters.

=== War of the Fourth Coalition ===
==== Campaign in Prussia ====
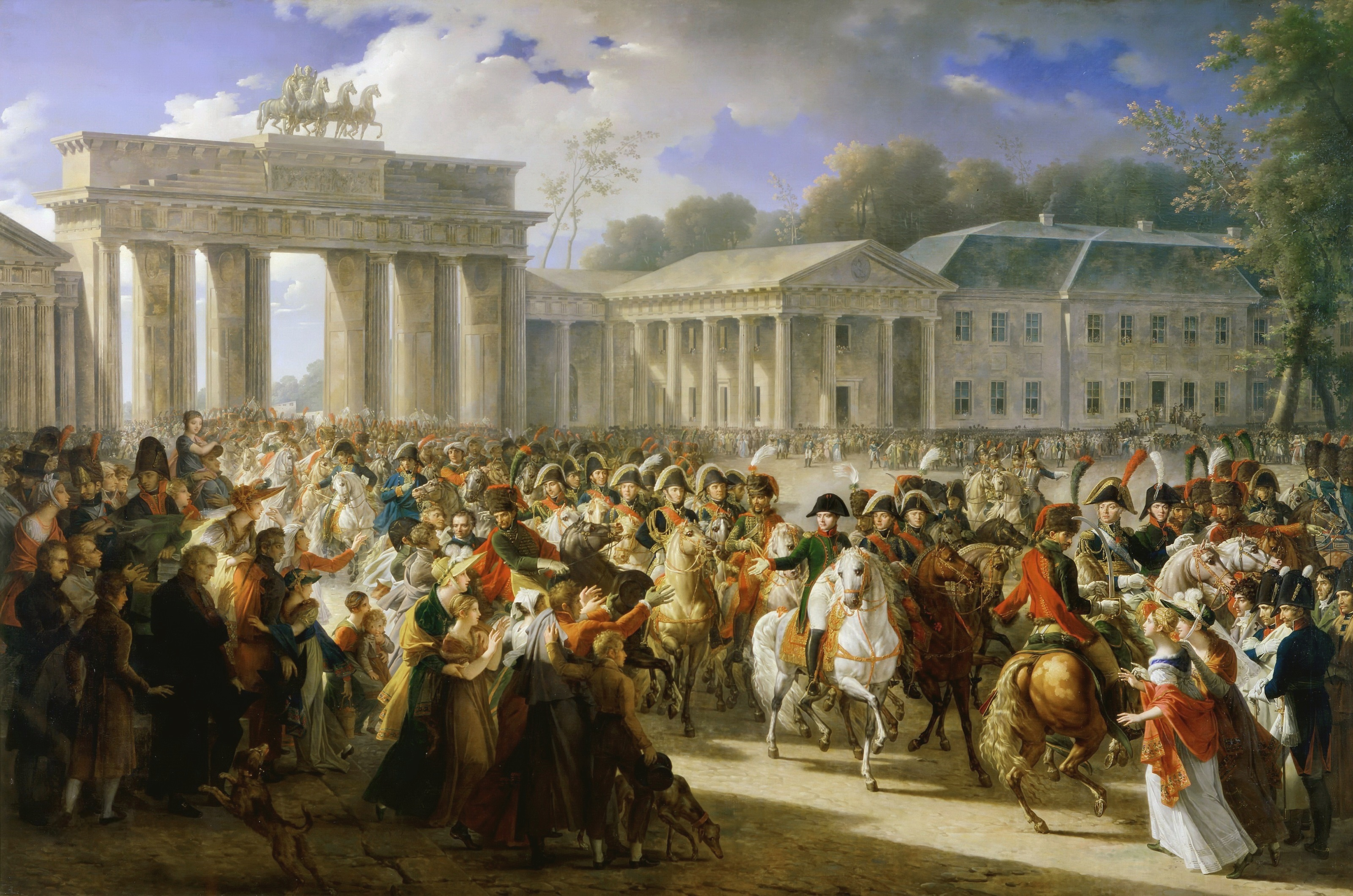
Entry of Napoleon into Berlin by Charles Meynier. The triumphal parade of the Grande Armée in the Prussian capital of Berlin on 25 October 1806

As the War of the Fourth Coalition broke out in September 1806, Emperor Napoleon I took his Grande Armée into the heart of Germany in a memorable campaign against Prussia. Comprising the same regiments as the year before (1st and 2nd Carabiniers-à-Cheval, 2nd, 3rd, 9th and 12th cuirassiers), Nansouty's 1st heavy cavalry division was again a part of Joachim Murat's cavalry reserve. At first, due to the extraordinary speed of Napoleon's operations, the 1st heavy cavalry division and one of the two cuirassier brigades of d'Hautpoul's 2nd heavy cavalry division did not arrive at the front line in time to participate in the Battle of Jena. Beginning with the evening of 14 October, Nansouty's cavalry pursued the routed Prussian army, following an enemy corps of 10,000 infantrymen and 3 cavalry regiments into the streets of Erfurt on 15 October. With the enemy trapped in the city, Colonel Préval of the 3rd cuirassiers negotiated the capitulation of Erfurt by nightfall, which resulted in the capture of 12,000 prisoners of war (including 6,000 wounded) and 65 cannons.

Resuming its pursuit of the Prussian army, Nansouty's division was at Potsdam beginning on 25 October, and two days later they participated to the triumphant parade of the Grande Armée in Berlin, before being reviewed by the Emperor on 30 October. Beginning on 7 November, Nansouty and his division were with Murat, heading for the river Vistula, which they crossed on 22 December with the rest of the cavalry reserve. After a brief and successful cavalry action at the Lapazin bridge, they tried to get to the Battle of Golymin in time for the action, but were delayed by the thick mud and by the slower dragoon division that preceded them; they arrived after the battle. The division then took winter quarters in Warsaw, but with Murat on sick leave, Nansouty was soon called to replace him, taking command of Lasalle's light cavalry division and the dragoon divisions of Klein and Milhaud. These divisions were placed in the first line of the army, and Nansouty, although formally placed under the overall command of Marshal Jean-de-Dieu Soult, had orders to act independently and report directly to the Emperor if any unforeseen and extraordinary events should occur. Nansouty handled this new mission with care, personally patrolling the front line and deciding where to place the pickets of light cavalry that were to cover the infantry outposts.

==== Campaign in Poland: early manoeuvres ====
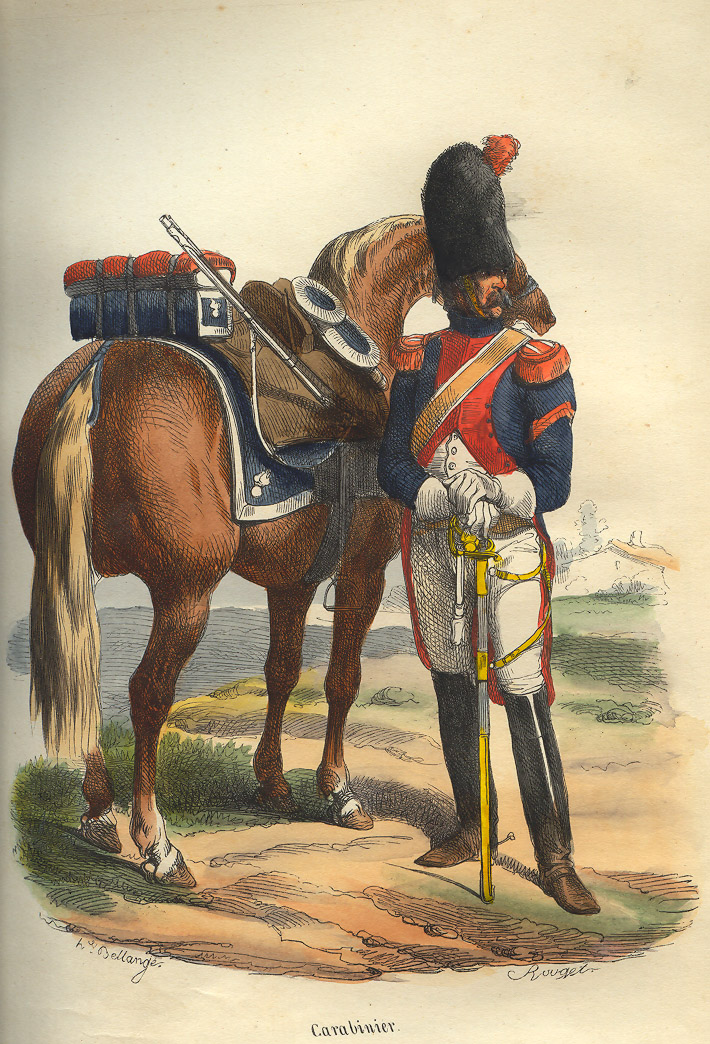
Before 1810, the two heavy cavalry regiments of carabiniers-à-cheval wore no cuirass. They were a part of Nansouty's heavy cavalry division between 1804 and 1809.

With the news of the alarming Russian operations against the left wing of the army, Murat reassumed command of the cavalry reserve, ordering Nansouty to retake command of the 1st heavy cavalry division and follow the concentration of the army towards Eylau. Joining his men in Warsaw, Nansouty diligently led them towards his assigned destination, but did not arrive until 13 February 1807, five days after the Battle of Eylau and too late to take part in any action. On 14 February, Nansouty learned of the death of his comrade and former commander during the Revolutionary Wars, General d'Hautpoul, who had been fatally wounded during the heroic cavalry charges at Eylau. After the battle, the Emperor decided that the army was to take winter quarters. To ensure the safety of his outposts, he sent Murat with a powerful column, including Nansouty's men, with the mission of pushing back any enemy they might find. A short skirmish involving the 1st heavy cavalry division occurred at Wolfsdorf on 10 March, before it was decided that all the heavy cavalry would be sent to the lower Vistula, where they were to rest and be reinforced.

With its ranks replenished after the winter actions, the six-regiment division under Nansouty numbered, on 1 June 1807, no less than 3,257 men. It was by far the most powerful heavy cavalry division of the Cavalry Reserve, which then included two other such divisions, the 2nd under Saint-Sulpice and a newly added 3rd, under Espagne. As military operation resumed later in 1807, Nasouty's division was hastily directed towards the town of Deppen, where Marshal Michel Ney had managed to retreat with his Corps, after energetically extricating himself from a dangerous situation, with surprisingly few losses. With Ney's Corps, the Cavalry Reserve and the Guard, Napoleon moved towards Guttstadt, where on 9 June he found a large combined-arms enemy force. Murat took Lasalle's light horse and Nansouty's heavy cavalry and launched a series of charges that drove back the enemy force. Murat continued to press on and pushed the enemy into the streets of Guttstadt, where he penetrated with the cavalry at nightfall. Having fought well with his men, Nansouty was rested the next day, leaving all the action at the Battle of Heilsberg to Espagne's 3rd Heavy Cavalry division.

At the beginning of June 1807, the Emperor reassessed his strategic situation and decided that he needed to move northeast, in order to prevent Bennigsen's Russian army from using the bridge at Friedland to cross the Alle river. If the Russians managed to cross the Alle river at Friedland, they could then move closer to their Prussian allies, who were based in Königsberg. Napoleon drew up a plan, giving Marshal Murat two army corps and a powerful cavalry reserve, with orders to march on Königsberg, while sending the rest of the troops towards Friedland. Leading the thrust towards Friedland was Marshal Jean Lannes's Reserve Corps (two infantry divisions and one cavalry brigade), with Grouchy's dragoons and Nansouty's horse carabiniers and cuirassiers temporarily attached. In Murat's absence, Grouchy was the senior cavalry commander and was to take overall command of all the cavalry that remained with the Emperor.

==== Campaign in Poland: Friedland ====
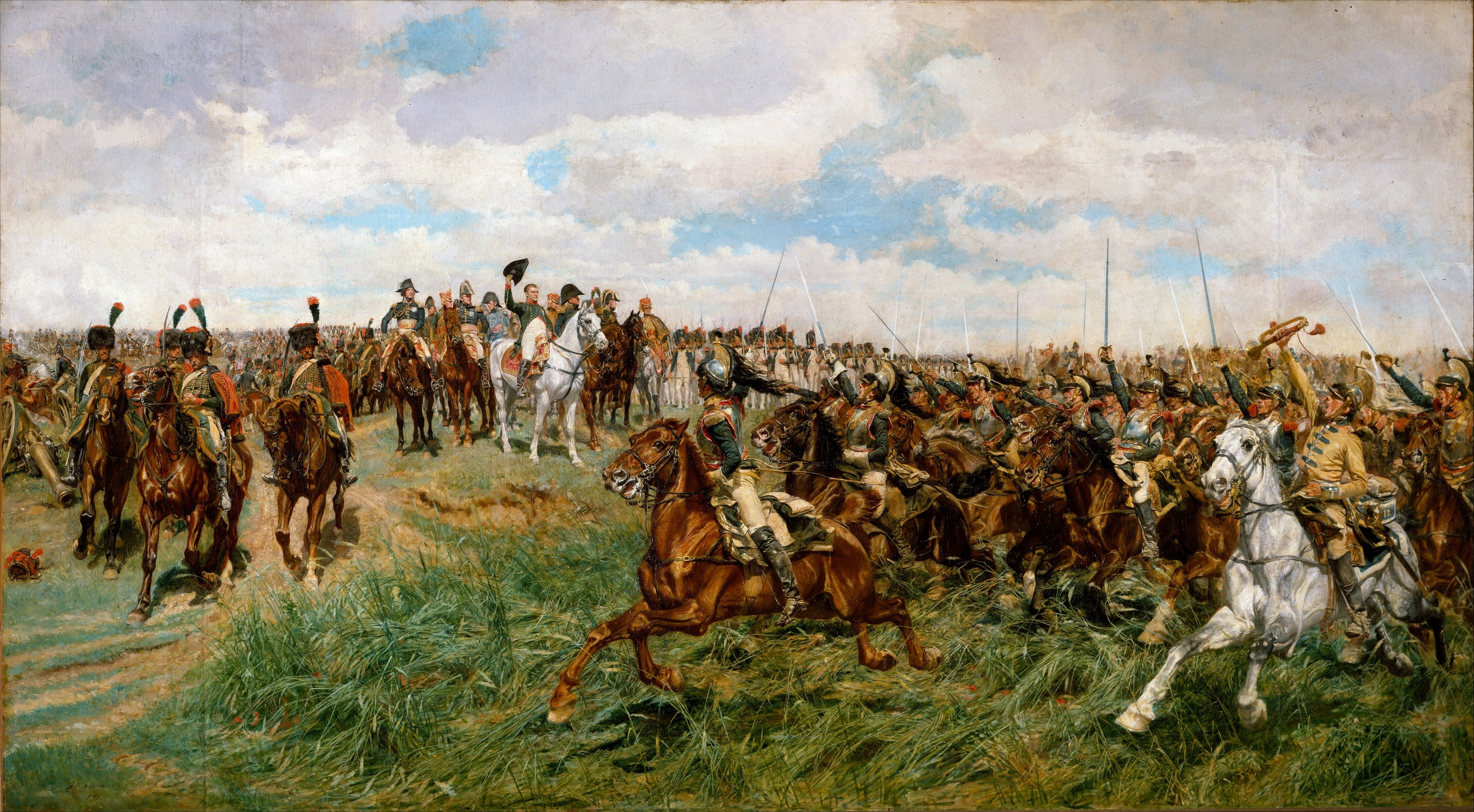
Nansouty's cuirassiers charging at the Battle of Friedland on 14 June 1807

Arriving with his corps at Friedland on 13 June after nightfall, Lannes found the position already occupied by Russian forces. Very early on 14 June, Lannes intrepidly attacked with an almost symbolic force (between 11,000 and 13,500 men) against the might of a massed enemy army of 85,000. His goal was to prevent the enemy from crossing the Alle and to give Napoleon enough time to arrive with the remainder of his forces. Nansouty's division arrived on the field of battle at Friedland after the first engagements and was directed towards the strategic village of Heinrichsdorf. This village needed to be held, as it protected Lannes's communications with the rest of Napoleon's army. Grouchy also directed his dragoon division towards the village and was shocked to find it in enemy hands and Nansouty's men retreating at a trot, without even attempting to contain the enemy or to cover the route that represented the corps' communication line. In fact, Nansouty had arrived not long before and had been instructed to place himself at Heinrichsdorf, without further instructions and without being informed of what was happening on the right. As Russian infantry and cavalry were boldly pressing him, he became concerned with his own lines of communication and thus ordered his men back, to avoid being cut off.

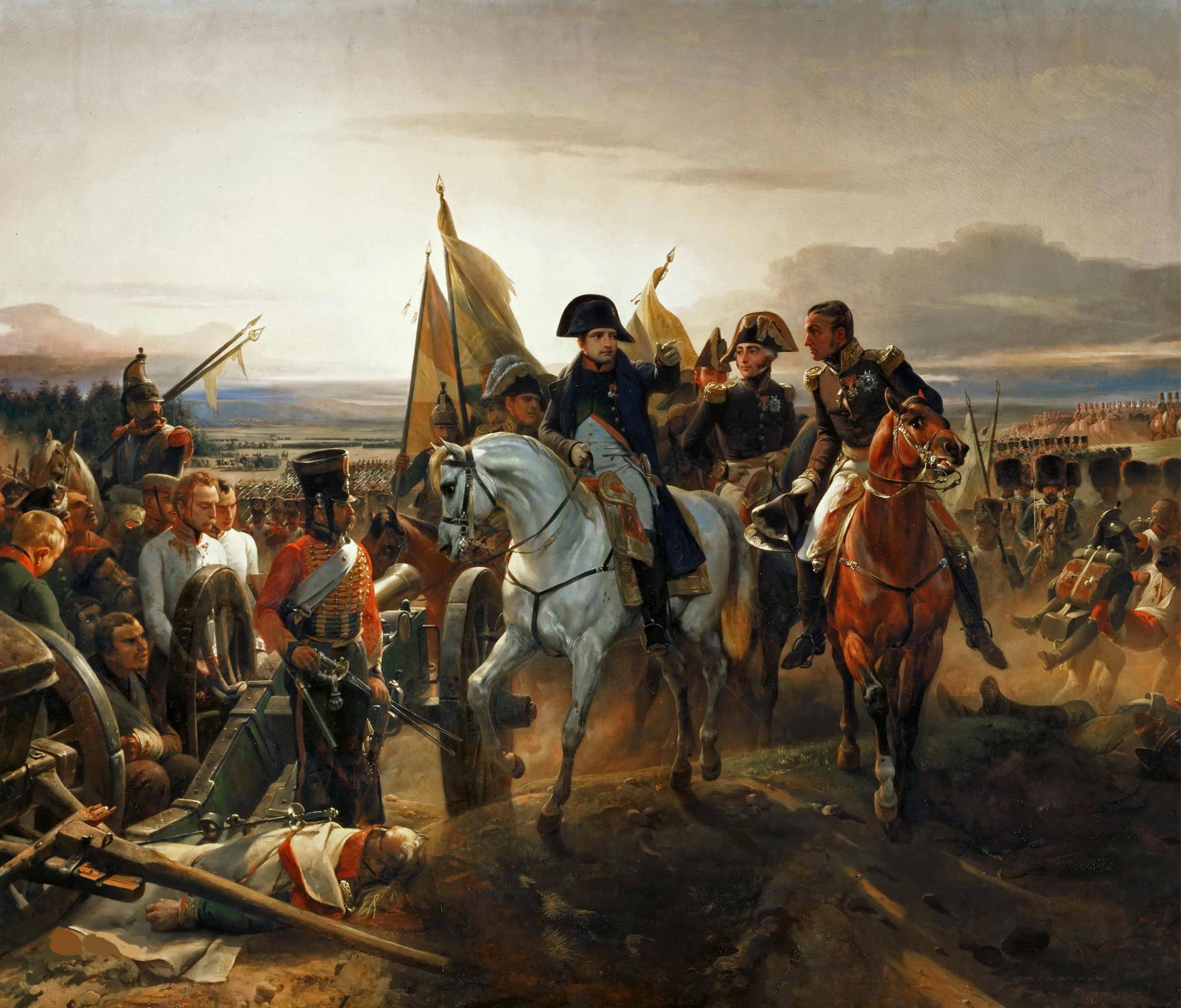
Napoleon giving orders for an attack at the Battle of Friedland. General Nansouty had an important role during this battle and is honoured by being depicted alongside the Emperor (on his left) in this painting by Horace Vernet.

However, Nansouty's move compromised Lannes's entire plan, which counted on powerful reinforcements arriving through Heinrichsdorf. An alarmed Lannes immediately sent one of his aides de camp to Grouchy urging him to stop the enemy from cutting his communications with the Emperor, whatever the cost. Grouchy duly took command of Nansouty's leading squadrons, ordering them back to their initial position, then launched a desperate but successful charge with his own dragoons, arriving in the streets of the village and cutting off its Russian defenders. Grouchy's dragoons became disorganised and were badly positioned following this sudden charge, and the Russian cavalry countercharged them, but Nansouty arrived just in time and the French repulsed the Russian cavalry, momentarily securing the position. A lively argument ensued between the two cavalry commanders. Grouchy invoked his seniority and position as commander of the cavalry and criticised Nansouty's earlier decision to withdraw. Nansouty countered by saying that he had superior experience at handling cavalry. When combat resumed, the quarrel did not prevent Nansouty from performing brilliantly under Grouchy's command during the dramatic series of events that followed. Having been repulsed earlier, the Russians decided to force the position at Heinrichsdorf, and they assembled a strong infantry force preceded by no less than 60 cavalry squadrons, plus around 2,000 Cossacks. To counter this move, Grouchy opted for deception, luring some of the enemy cavalry away from the infantry. Then, Grouchy charged the enemy horse from the front; simultaneously Nansouty hit them from the flank and together Grouchy and Nansouty repulsed them. Despite numerous charges and countercharges, the French cavalry maintained the upper hand.

After the arrival of the Emperor with significant reinforcements, the time was right for a general counterattack. The Emperor planned his main attack against the Russian left and he wanted to prevent the enemy from transferring reinforcements from their right wing to their battered left. To that effect, Grouchy received orders to incessantly harass the enemy before him, in order to prevent Bennigsen from redeploying them on the left wing. Orders also required Grouchy to silence the enemy guns pounding the French left. In this difficult task, Grouchy was perfectly seconded by Nansouty, and together they ended to the Russian cannonade in this sector. Later, Grouchy's report expressed admiration for Nansouty's actions, adding that the latter had "gloriously repaired" his earlier error. Nansouty was also mentioned in the 79th Bulletin of the Grande Armée. After the battle, the 1st heavy cavalry division joined in the pursuit of the Russian army to the Nieman river, but the Treaties of Tilsit in July soon ended hostilities.

=== Count of the Empire, First Squire and the Peninsula ===
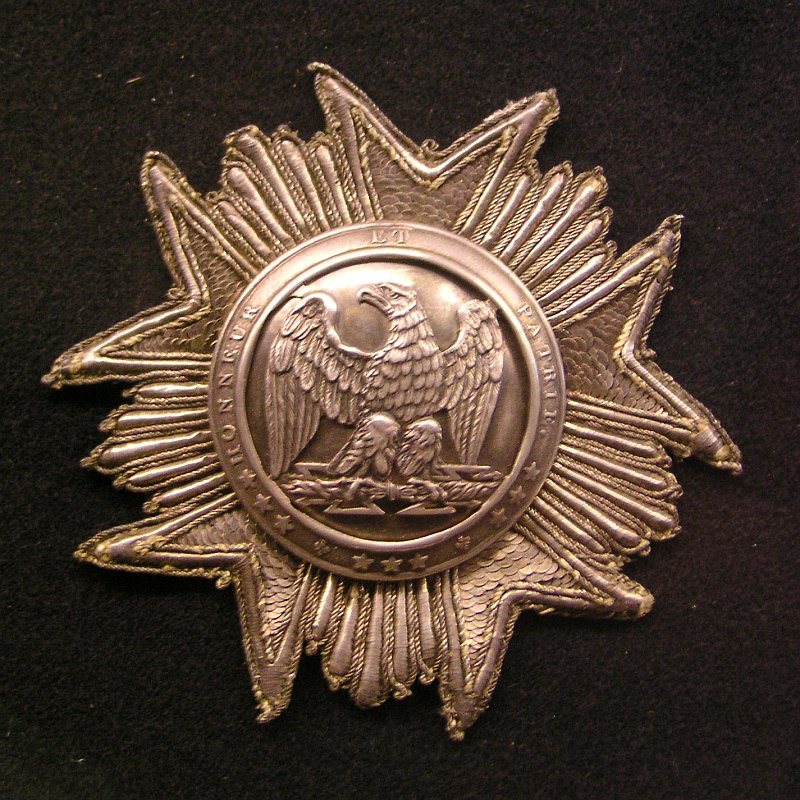
The Grand Aigle de la Légion d'Honneur decoration

The numerous honours and endowments that General Nansouty received following the Battle of Friedland seem to suggest the Emperor's appreciation and the fact that Napoleon did not regard the early incident during this battle as Nansouty's fault. On 11 July 1807, General of Division Nansouty was named Grand Aigle de la Légion d'Honneur, the fifth and top rank of this order, reserved for the greatest general officers. This also brought an annual revenue of 20,000 Francs. His first endowment of 12,846 Francs was offered on 30 June 1807, and was paid by the Duchy of Warsaw. On 23 September, he received another 5,882 Francs on the Empire's Grand Livre. A count of the Empire from 10 March 1808, Nansouty was offered two additional endowments, one of 25,000 Francs, paid by the Kingdom of Westphalia, and the second of 10,000 Francs, paid by the Zeven domain in Hannover. He also received an endowment of 100,000 Francs for the acquisition of a Parisian Hôtel particulier; Nansouty bought the Hôtel du Président Duret in the Faubourg Saint-Germain, a neighbourhood inhabited by the new elite of Imperial France. Indeed, first-rate military figures such as the Viceroy of Italy Eugène, Marshals Davout and Lannes and Generals Rapp and Legrand also acquired residences in Faubourg Saint-Germain.

Additionally, in 1808, he was offered the position of First Squire of the Emperor in Napoleon's Military Household, a dignity that offered an annual revenue of 30,000 Francs and which gained importance when the Grand Squire, General Armand Augustin Louis de Caulaincourt, was sent to Saint-Petersburg as ambassador. Napoleon allegedly chose Nansouty for his elegant manners and education, aristocratic posture and talent for administration. In his capacity as First Squire, Nansouty thus had to accompany the Emperor during the latter's short campaign in Spain (from November 1808 to early January 1809). There, he was in charge of several administrative tasks linked with managing the Emperor's stable services and suite and commanding his orderly officers. The Emperor's aides-de-camp had their own aides-de-camp, who were also placed under the command of the First Squire. Although never very far away from the Emperor in a campaign that included many battles, Nansouty himself never exercised a field command during this campaign, and in January 1809, he accompanied his master back to France, as the outbreak of the War of the Fifth Coalition was imminent.

=== War of the Fifth Coalition ===
With a large part of the French Empire's forces now entangled in the bloody Peninsular War, the Austrian Empire believed that its best opportunity to avenge the humiliating defeat of 1805 had finally come. The Austrians were looking to defeat France and regain their former influence in Italy and Germany. In early 1809, the Austrian war preparations were so intense that Napoleon was forced to leave Spain and head back to Paris to reorganise his main army in Germany. In spring, Nansouty was therefore recalled to the command of 1st of the three heavy cavalry divisions of the Cavalry Reserve, placed this time under the command of Marshal Jean-Baptiste Bessières. As the War of the Fifth Coalition broke out, Nansouty's division was soon detached from the Reserve and temporarily attached to Marshal Louis Nicolas Davout's III Corps, the force that was assigned the most difficult tasks during the early military operations of this war. As Napoleon then ordered a concentration of the army at Ratisbon, Nansouty's division was once again put under the command of Bessières and sent to serve with the Bavarian army. After his initial victories at Abensberg and Landshut, Napoleon concentrated the bulk of his army, including Nansouty's men, at Eckmühl, where Davout was waiting.

==== Eckmühl and Ratisbon ====
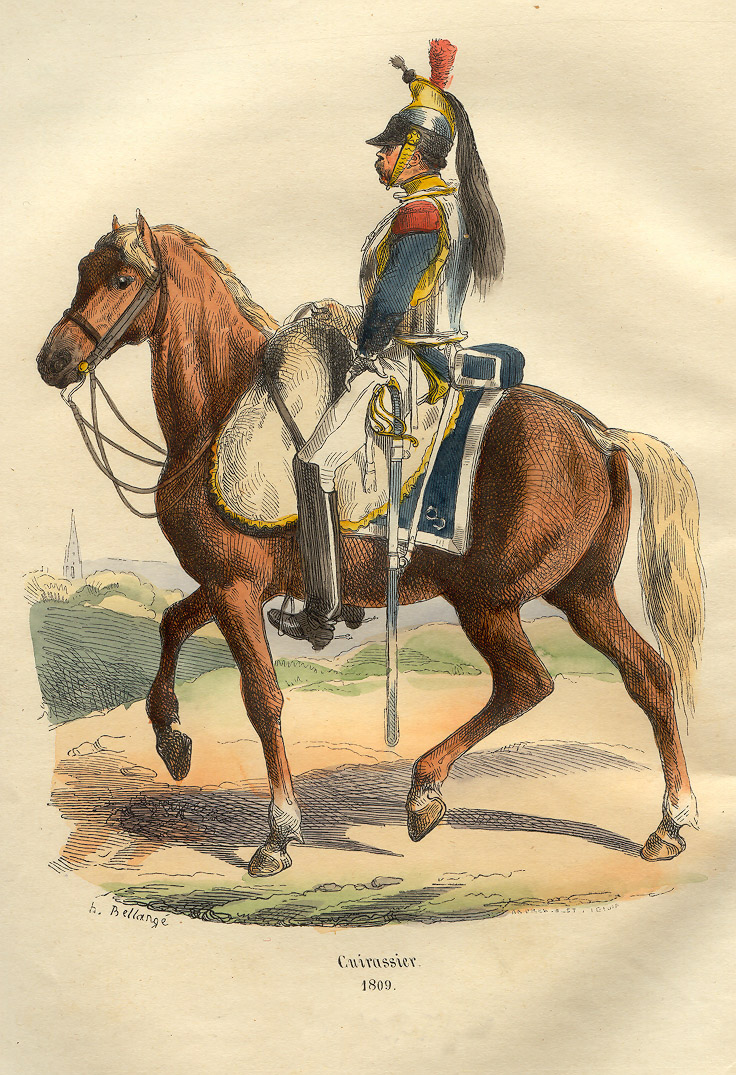
A French cuirassier in 1809, fully equipped for shock action

Napoleon faced Archduke Charles's Austrian army at the Battle of Eckmühl, on 21–22 April 1809. On 22 April, the second day of the battle, Nansouty was at first sent to the Schierling plain, in support of Bavarian General Deroy, who, after several failed attempts, managed to take the town of Eckmühl from the enemy. Apart from the Schierling plain, the terrain at Eckmühl was very uneven and hilly, with dangerously steep slopes, which made cavalry action here improper. Yet, it was here that one of the most memorable cavalry actions of the entire Napoleonic Wars was to take place. It all began on the slopes next to Eckmühl, where a first brief cavalry engagement occurred, as Bavarian and Württemberger cavalry encountered and charged Austrian cavalry. The Austrians won out and the Bavarians and Württembergers retreated and reformed in the vicinity of the two French heavy cavalry divisions present. These two divisions, the 1st under Nansouty (1st and 2nd Carabiniers-à-cheval, 2nd, 3rd, 9th and 12th Cuirassiers) and the 2nd under Saint-Sulpice (four regiments strong), were placed next to one another, forming five lines, with their regiments in column, one in front of the other. These men were ordered forward, up the slope and onto the plateau where the light cavalry had been repulsed moments earlier. Arriving on the plateau at a gallop, the cavalry overtook Marshal Lannes's infantry, who admiringly cheered "Vive les cuirassiers" ("Long live the cuirassiers") and applauded as the cavalry galloped past them,. With their two frontline regiments now deployed in line and with the German light cavalry protecting their flanks, the two heavy cavalry divisions clashed into whatever Austrian cavalry they could find on the plateau, repulsing them with ease. This was, however, only the prelude of a much larger cavalry combat.

In order to protect his retreat, Archduke Charles of Austria reunited his entire cavalry reserve, 44 squadrons in all, on either side of the Ratisbon road, next to the village of Eggolsheim. Between 19:00 20:00 in the evening, Napoleon ordered his cavalry to disperse the enemy horse from this position. In preparation of the charge, Nansouty formed five of his regiments in two lines: three regiments in the first line and two in the second line, leaving his remaining regiment with Saint-Sulpice. Saint-Sulpice's division was on Nansouty's right and it remained formed in regiment column formations, while the light cavalry was protecting the flanks of the whole. In all, the French had 48 squadrons, and, as they advanced, they were met by intense artillery fire from the Austrian batteries and then vigorously charged by the Gottesheim cuirassier regiment. Seeing the enemy charging, Nansouty ordered his squadrons forward towards the enemy, but at a gentle trot. Then, as soon as the Austrians were at about one hundred paces, the frontline regiment of Carabiniers-à-Cheval halted, loaded their carbines and fired a salvo from thirty or forty paces, then drew their swords and joined their fellow cuirassiers in an energetic charge. As Nansouty led, Saint-Sulpice followed and, despite the vigour and determination of the Austrian cavalry, they were repulsed after a brief hand-to-hand combat. Coming in support of the Gottesheim Cuirassiers, the Kaiser Cuirassier regiment shared the same fate, with the Stipsicz Hussars and Vincent Chevau-légers also repulsed. A generalised and bloody mêlée then occurred under the moonlight, with the sabre hits on the steel cuirasses producing sparkles in the night. Austrian General Andreas von Schneller was wounded during this action and General Karl Wilhelm von Stutterheim, commanding the entire Austrian cavalry, only just escaped capture. The Austrian cavalry was repulsed and pushed into the marshes beyond, subsequently retreating towards Köfering, with the bulk of Archduke Charles's forces retreating towards Ratisbon.

The pursuit resumed the next day at dawn, and was followed by yet another action at the Battle of Ratisbon, where the Austrians tried to delay the French pursuit. After fierce fighting, during which Nansouty's and Saint-Sulpice's men successfully charged the enemy cavalry three times, the French captured the citadel at Ratisbon, but saw the Austrians skilfully retreating. Nansouty was left at Ratisbon with Davout, to observe the retreat of Archduke Charles.

==== Aspern-Essling ====
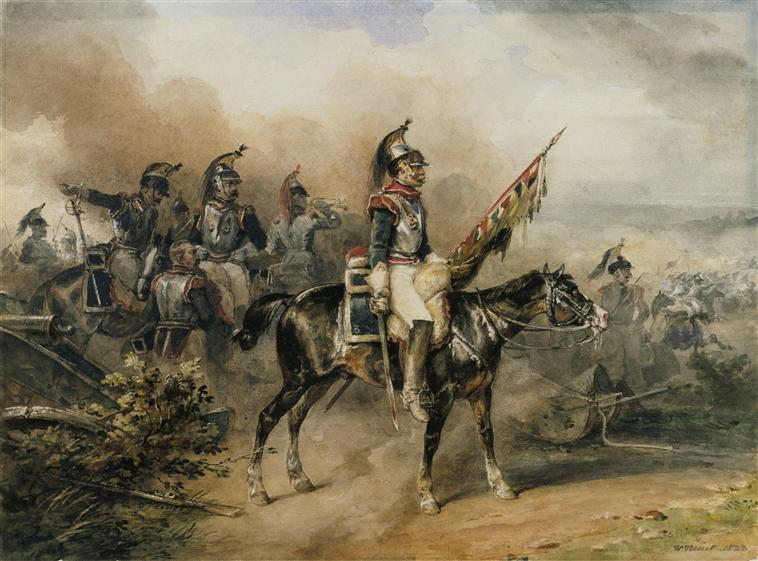
French cuirassiers from the 3rd regiment during a charge. At the Battle of Aspern-Essling, the 3rd cuirassiers was a part of the brigade of General Antoine de Saint-Germain, under the overall command of General of Division Nansouty.

On 21 May 1809, Napoleon crossed the Danube not far from Vienna and attacked Archduke Charles's Austrian army, situated on the northern bank of the river, in what became known as the Battle of Aspern-Essling. The French were nonetheless critically outnumbered and it soon became obvious that they would have a hard time just holding out. Nansouty could only get one of his brigades, Saint-Germain's 3rd and 12th cuirassiers, across the Danube for the action on 21 May. He found the heroic cuirassiers of General Jean-Louis-Brigitte Espagne charging, as they had done all day long, in a desperate attempt to stop Austrian attacks on the thin French battle line. Espagne had just been killed in action and his exhausted and depleted squadrons needed to be relieved. Nansouty at once brought forward Saint-Germain's squadrons and charged the enemy infantry, allowing the army to maintain itself on the position.

On the second day of the battle, 22 May, Nansouty received his second cuirassier brigade, Doumerc's 2nd and 9th regiments. During the morning, having received some reinforcements, Napoleon sent Marshal Lannes's Corps forward, in an attack against the enemy line. Nansouty's and Lasalle's cavalry protected the infantry columns, charging the enemy cavalry to clear their path. However, at around 21:00 in the morning, news that the great bridge over the Danube had broken, making the arrival of further reinforcements virtually impossible, forced Napoleon to call off his attack and order a phased retreat. The situation of the French army was critical, with Marshal Lannes fatally wounded, and a great number of losses in men. It took all the skill of Nansouty and the other cavalry commanders to contain the formidable Austrian onslaught in order to allow the rest of the army to gradually disengage. After most of the army had safely crossed an arm of the Danube onto the island of Lobau, Nansouty's men were also withdrawn from the battlefield during the night, with the French cavalry subsequently celebrated for their role in preventing a catastrophic defeat that day.

==== Wagram ====
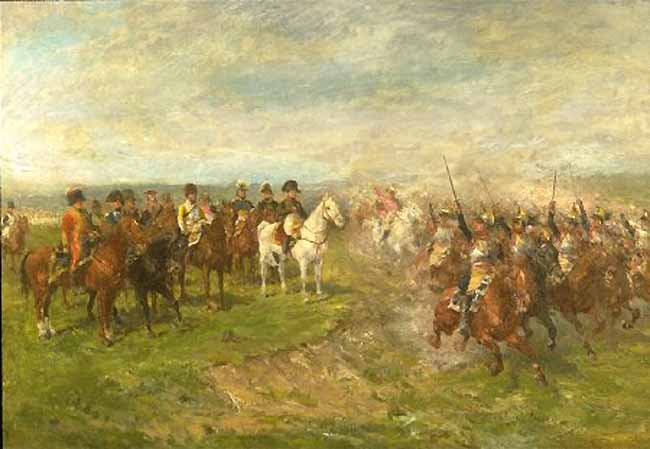
Nansouty's cuirassiers charging at the Battle of Wagram. Painting by Guido Sigriste.

After the bloody setback at Aspern-Essling, Napoleon took six weeks to carefully plan another crossing of the Danube. He launched this operation late on 4 July and, by the early hours of the next day, he had managed to get a substantial force across the river. Nansouty's division did not see any action during the first day of the Battle at Wagram and at night they camped behind the Imperial Guard. The next day, 6 July, Nansouty was at first directed to support Davout, on the French right, but when it became clear that the latter's sector was not threatened by the arrival of enemy reinforcements, they were ordered back into reserve in a central position on the battlefield, not far from the village of Aderklaa. Then, as the situation on the French left rapidly deteriorated, they were called into action, when Napoleon ordered Marshal Bessières, commander of the Cavalry Reserve, to launch his men in a charge against the Austrians menacing his left. With time at the essence, Bessières opted not to wait for the Guard cavalry and, with his other two heavy cavalry divisions assigned to other sectors of the battlefield, he decided to lead forward only Nansouty's men. This division was indeed very strong: 24 squadrons, more than 4,000 men, including Brigadier General Defrance's 1st and 2nd carabiniers-à-cheval, Brigadier General Doumerc's 2nd and 9th cuirassiers and Brigadier General Berckheim's 3rd and 12th cuirassiers.

Bessières and Nansouty led these men forward, through a hail of cannonballs and case-shot, with the carabiniers-à-cheval at the front. Finding a weaker spot in the Austrian line, they pierced it and stormed past the enemy infantry formed in squares, sabering the Georger Grenzer battalion as they went along their way. However, many of the French cavalry did not manage to penetrate through the formidable masses of Austrian infantry, so Nansouty was now commanding a much diminished force. Showing great skill in handling his men, Nansouty then wheeled right and charged Liechtenstein's artillery line. However, the Austrian cavalry promptly intervened, spearheaded by the Rosenberg chevaulegers and the Kronprinz cuirassier regiments, which caught the carabiniers-à-cheval in flank and repulsed them, pursuing them back to their lines. The costly repulse of Nansouty's division did not dishearten Bessières, who was preparing another rapid charge, now with the support of elements of the Guard cavalry. This charge never came, as the Marshal's horse was killed by a cannonball, with Bessières also hit and carried unconscious behind the lines. With his commander presumed dead, Nansouty did not know what the Emperor's orders were and thus promptly decided to pull back his men, to avoid further damage to his already battered division.

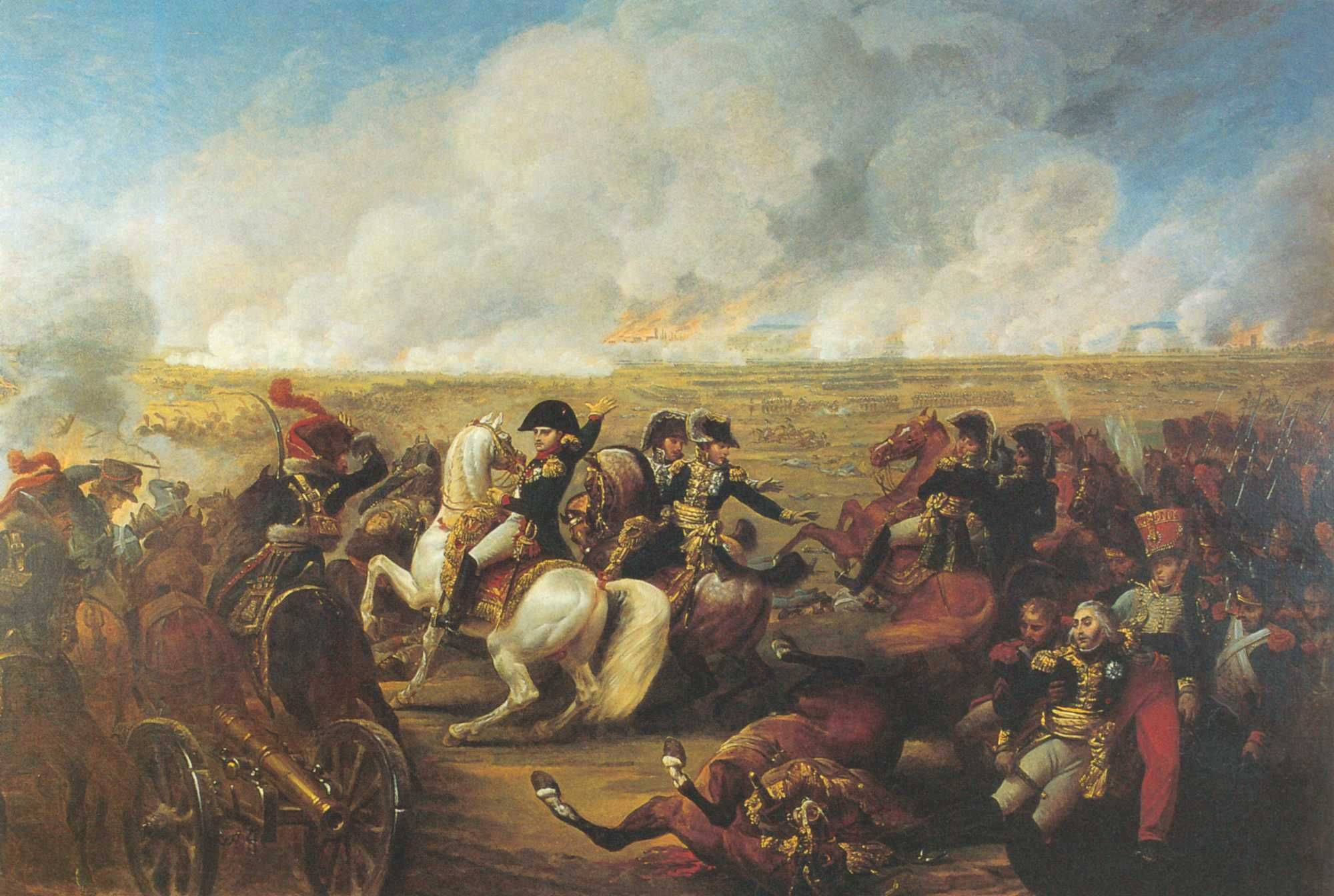
During the battle, Marshal Bessières (pictured on the right) was wounded and thought dead when his horse was killed by a cannonball. Detail of a painting by Antoine-Jean Gros.

This however was not to be the end of General Nansouty's action at the great Battle of Wagram. Although the great cavalry attack had done much to ease the pressure on Napoleon's left-centre, the latter's situation remained critical. The Emperor thus launched the Corps of General Jacques MacDonald in an attack against the Austrian right-centre. MacDonald's attack formation, formed by chance more than by any tactical forethought, was a huge infantry attack column or square, comprising all his divisions in a deep formation that was highly unusual for Napoleonic warfare. Four squadrons of Nansouty's carabiniers-à-cheval were sent to support the flank of this attack, with the rest of his division further back. Realising that his advance is hampered by intense Austrian artillery fire, MacDonald aimed to clear the enemy guns before him, asking for a cavalry charge from Walther's Guard cavalry on his right and Nansouty's 1st heavy cavalry division on his left. With no direct orders from the Emperor and his commander, Marshal Bessières, out of action, Walther opted not to move, while Nansouty did send his men forward but, having been positioned too far back, he arrived only after the enemy guns had moved away.

Nansouty's division suffered a very high casualty rate at the Battle of Wagram, with more men and horses lost than the other two heavy cavalry divisions combined. Losses in horses were extremely high, with 1,141 animals killed or injured, while losses in men were also significant, despite the fact that only the carabiniers-à-cheval really came into contact with the enemy. Overall, Nansouty's division lost 164 men killed and 436 wounded. Foremost of all, the highly battered two carabiniers-à-cheval regiments had no more than 300 horses standing between themselves by the end of the day, for an equine casualty rate of 77 percent, with the 9th and 12th cuirassiers also suffering high casualties. Bessières's charge, hastily organised with only the division of Nansouty, through murderous artillery fire and against masses of infantry prepared to receive them, had less tactical effect than at Aspern-Essling, but it did win Napoleon valuable time, allowing him to retake the initiative in this battle.

=== Interlude between two campaigns ===
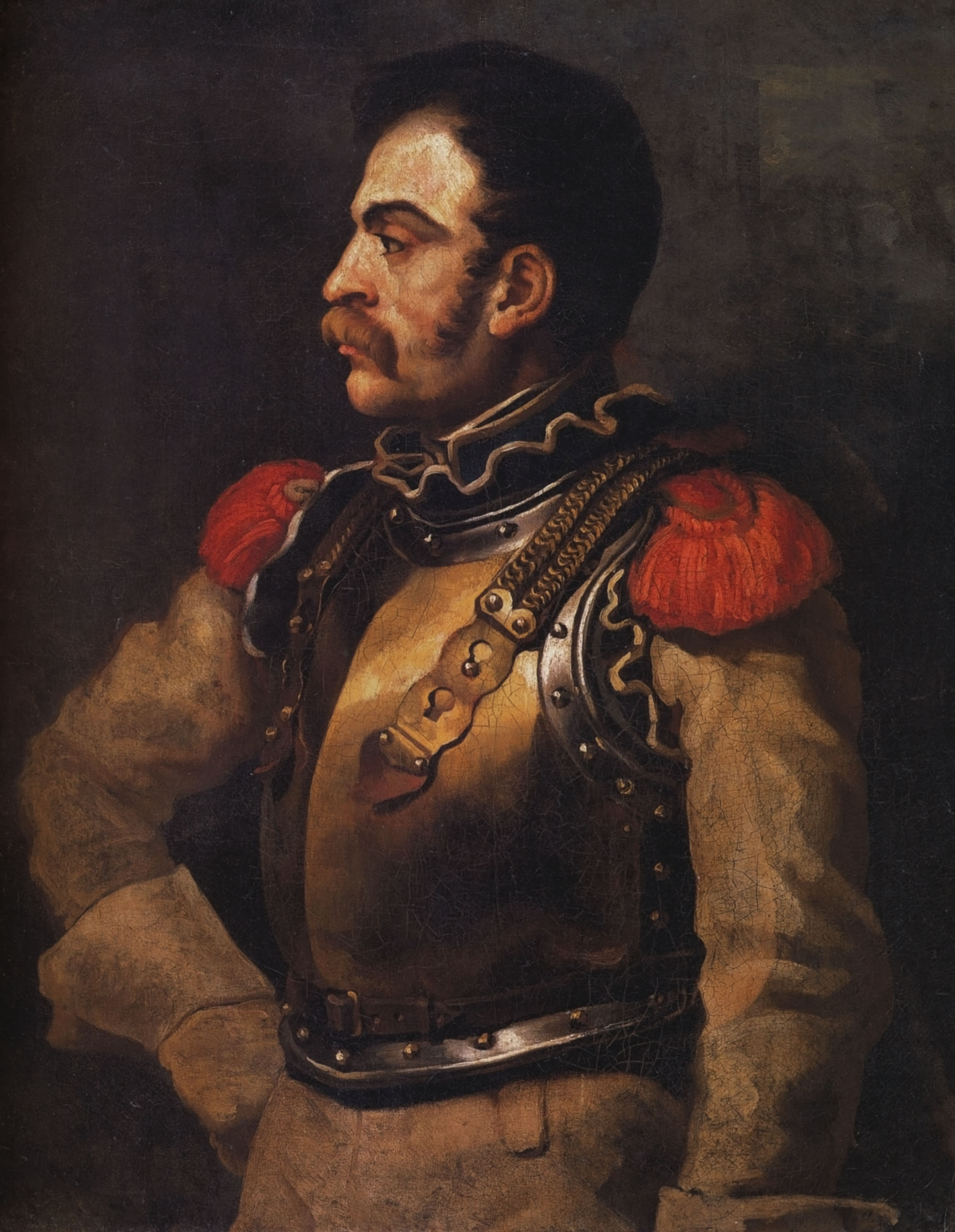
Cuirasses were adopted in 1810 for both Carabiniers-à-Cheval regiments, with Nansouty suggesting the idea.

General MacDonald was very critical of both Walther and Nansouty, for their alleged failure to provide proper cavalry support during his attack. MacDonald went on to write in his memoirs that he was "taken aback by the slowness of General Nansouty [...] Nansouty did charge in the end, but too late to take advantage of the gaping hole that I had pierced in the centre of the Austrian army." A few days after the Battle of Wagram, Napoleon confronted Nansouty over what he saw as being a failure to cooperate with MacDonald. Nansouty responded to the Emperor's lively reproaches by offering categorical explanations, saying that he had not been consulted in the placement of his division, rendering manoeuvres impossible during that action. As Napoleon insisted, Nansouty stood up to him, finally retorting: "After all, it is not Your Majesty at any rate who can teach me to lead cavalry..." Despite this remark, Nansouty would continue to be given significant commands in the coming years. It was shortly after this bloody battle that Nansouty insisted that the Carabiniers-à-Cheval be given the steel cuirass, in a bid to cancel out what he saw as being a state of inferiority of these troops vis-à-vis their fellow cuirassiers. Nansouty's initiative was approved and was enforced in 1810.

With the peace of Vienna signed between the French Empire and the Austrian Empire in October, Nansouty was ordered to leave the command of his division to General Bruyères and retake his position of First Squire alongside the Emperor (17 October 1809). However, with the return of the Grand Squire Armand Augustin Louis de Caulaincourt, the role of the First Squire was much diminished. As a result, in 1811 Nansouty was given an additional function, that of General Inspector of cavalry. Very active in exercising this function, he soon became reputed for his strictness and for his detailed knowledge and invaluable experience that he had of this arm. Nonetheless, war was, once more, not far away and, on 19 October 1811, Nansouty was called to the command of the 2nd and 4th cuirassier divisions of the "Observation Corps of the Elbe", under the command of Marshal Louis Nicolas Davout. Then, with the reorganisation of the Grande Armée in April 1812, Nansouty was named at the command of the I Cavalry Corps.

=== Campaign in Russia ===
With the outbreak of the war with Russia in 1812, the Grande Armée included, alongside the usual combined-arms Army Corps, four large Cavalry Reserve Corps, commanded respectively by Generals Nansouty (Ist), Montbrun (IInd), Grouchy (IIIrd) and La Tour Maubourg (IVth Corps). This innovation has been much criticised after this campaign and, in the words of Marshal Marmont, it had the only merit of "presenting an extraordinary spectacle that astonished the eye."

During this campaign, Nansouty's I Cavalry Corps was composed of:

- General Bruyères's 1st light cavalry division (7th, 8th Hussars, 16th Chasseurs à cheval, 9th Chevau-légers lanciers, one Prussian and one Polish light horse regiments),
- General Saint-Germain's 1st cuirassier division (2nd, 3rd, 9th Cuirassiers, 1st Chevau-légers lanciers regiments),
- General Valence's 5th cuirassier division (6th, 11th and 12th Cuirassiers, 5th Chevau-légers lanciers regiments),
- an artillery of 36 pieces.

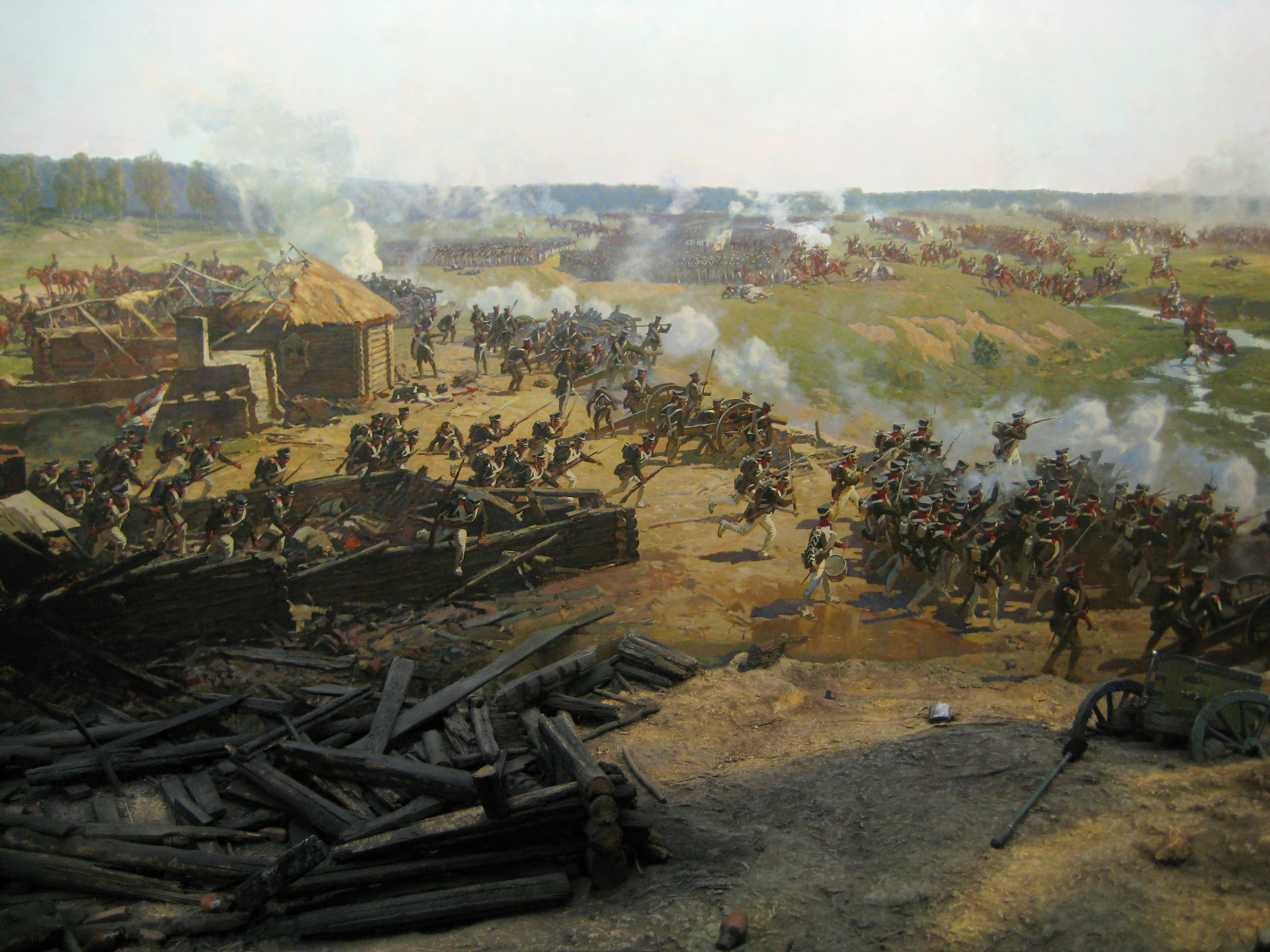
Nansouty's cuirassiers attack squares of Russian guardsmen to the left of Semyanovskaya (background) during the early stages of the Battle of Borodino. Detail from the Borodino Panorama by Franz Roubaud, 1912.

Having crossed the Niemen river with his Corps, Nansouty would continuously march under the command of Joachim Murat during this campaign, preceding the advance of the army and taking Wilna as they advanced. Despite marching constantly alongside Murat and Emperor Napoleon, Nansouty's Ist Corps of cavalry reserve saw little action, combating brilliantly in a vanguard action at Ostrovno and then briefly at Vitebsk. An incident involving some of Nansouty's light cavalry occurred during the combat at Vitebsk, when the 8th Hussars and 16th Chasseurs à cheval turned and fled before the Russian light horse. This was evidence that the division of Bruyères, of which they were a part, had been much used by always being placed at the vanguard of the army, resulting in the loss many of the best and bravest troopers. Despite Nansouty's best efforts, the extremely long and exhausting marches, the torrential rains and the absence of proper fodder took their toll on the Ist Cavalry Corps, with numbers reduced to half by this time. Additionally, just like the other Cavalry Corps commanders, Nansouty rarely had all his troops under direct control, which led to cavalry being used improperly at times.

With his three divisions reunited on 7 September 1812, Nansouty's Ist Cavalry Corps saw action at the Battle of Borodino. He was placed on the French right, in second line, behind the Corps of Marshal Davout and, after Murat managed to take two of the redoubts on the Russian left, Nansouty placed his men on the right of this position and then supported the advance of the right wing of the army. With the Russians making an offensive comeback, Nansouty placed himself at the head of the heavy divisions of Saint-Germain and Valence and charged and while doing so a bullet pierced one of his knees. This was Nansouty's first battle wound and it was serious enough to end his active role during this campaign. He was transported to Moscow following the battle and although still wounded, on 10 October, he was entrusted with the mission of commanding the convoy that was to take the wounded generals and colonels, as well as the main trophies captured, behind the lines. During this mission, he was exposed to great danger, to famine and extreme cold, which impacted his already frail health. He was then allowed to return to France and recover from his injury.

=== War of the Sixth Coalition ===
The remains of the French army had completely evacuated Russian territory by December 1812 but their defeat sparked anti-French sentiments in Germany and Prussia joined the Russians, forming a Sixth Coalition. Hostilities thus continued in early 1813 but Nansouty's wound did not yet allow him to return to action, so he was offered the prestigious position of Colonel-General of dragoons (16 January), in replacement of General Louis Baraguey d'Hilliers, who had just died of exhaustion. Nansouty's wound was very serious but he had been very lucky: the bullet that pierced his knee only tore through flesh, leaving his kneecap intact. Having missed the first part of the campaign, General Nansouty was recalled to a field command once his knee wound was cured, towards mid-1813. He accepted to take the helm of the Guard cavalry, with a complement of 5,000 sabres, and including Guyot's Grenadiers-à-cheval, Letort's Dragons, Lefebvre-Desnouettes Chasseurs-à-cheval and Édouard Colbert's Chevau-légers lanciers.

==== Campaign in Saxony ====
In 1813, most military operations took part in Saxony, with the Chasseurs-à-cheval and Colbert's Chevau-légers lanciers encountering the enemy in several isolated cavalry actions, but the first serious action came only at the Battle of Dresden, where Nansouty's Guard cavalry supported Marshal Michel Ney's attack on the extreme left, in conjunction with Marshal Édouard Mortier's "Young Guard" infantry divisions.

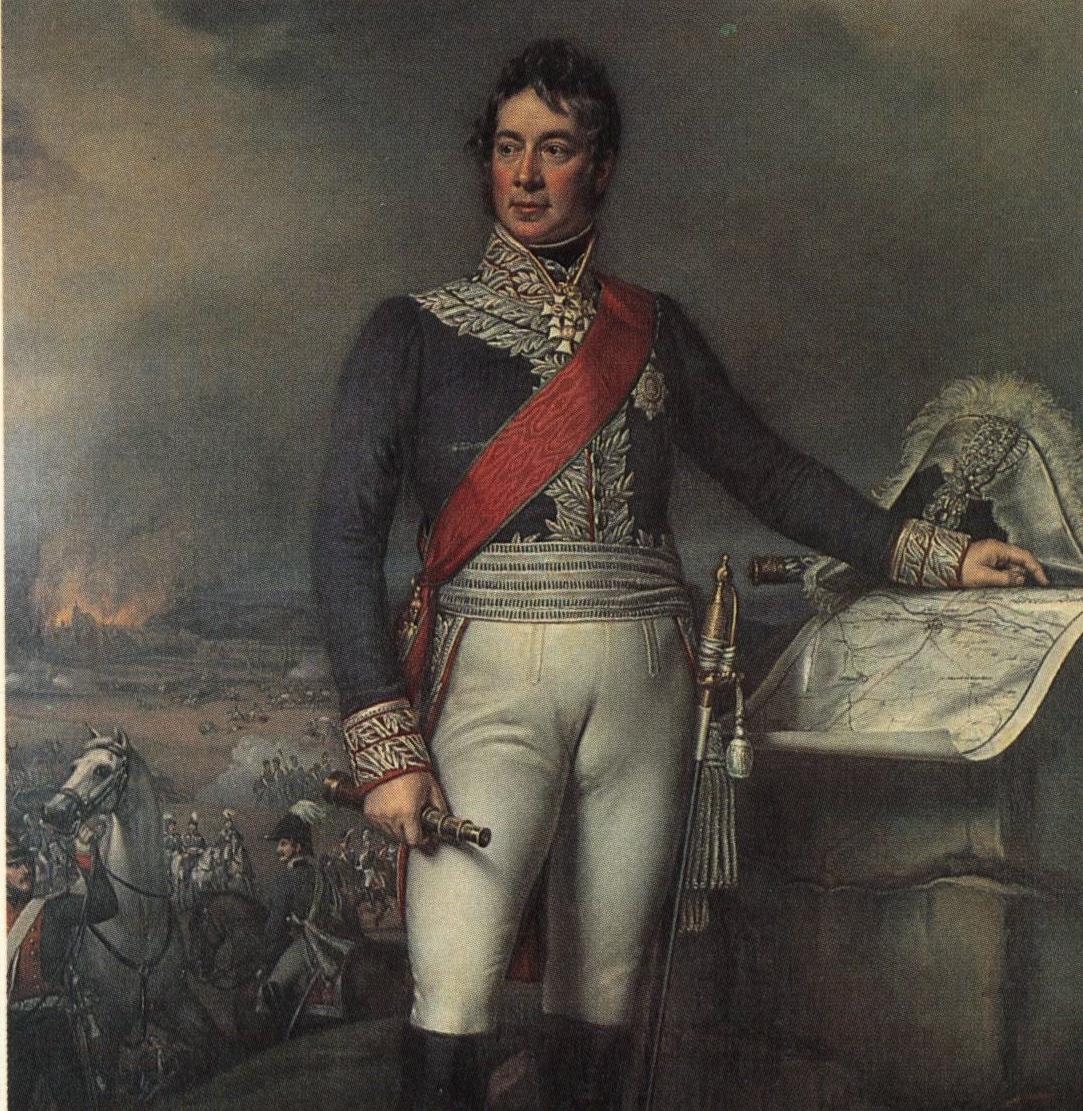
Bavarian General Karl Philipp von Wrede tried to block Napoleon's retreat to France, resulting in the Battle of Hanau. During the battle, the Austro-Bavarian cavalry was defeated by Nansouty's Imperial Guard cavalry.

However, the Guard cavalry was not needed as a whole before the epic "Battle of Nations" at Leipzig. Placed in reserve at first, the Guard cavalry and artillery had to spring into action at once, after Napoleon received news of the Saxon defection. With the Saxons now in the Coalition camp and firing at the soldiers who moments before had been their allies, the situation of some of the French troops became desperate. The position of General Durutte's division, placed close to Saxon lines, was particularly tenuous and Napoleon soon came to its aid, with Nansouty in command of the Guard cavalry and horse artillery. Nansouty launched an impetuous charge with some of his regiments, the Grenadiers-à-cheval, Dragons and Chevau-légers and the Saxons were unable to hold out in this sector. However, the situation changed on 19 October, with the untimely explosion of a bridge over the Elster, the main retreat line for the French rearguard, which was now blocked in the city of Leipzig. The Guard cavalry extricated itself from the field of battle and was very useful in covering the retreat of the remaining French forces.

With the Grande Armée in full retreat, another dangerous situation occurred on 29 October. With Bavaria now also in the camp of the Coalition, an Austro-Bavarian army of some 45,000 men, under General Karl Philipp von Wrede, who had fought under the command of the Emperor during the previous campaigns, tried to block the French retreat and delay the French force until the arrival of the rest of the Coalition forces. Wrede had the means necessary to achieve his goal, as he possessed a numerous artillery of about one hundred pieces and a powerful cavalry of 50 squadrons. In comparison, the French forces were much dispersed and only a few units remained cohesive and combat-capable. During the ensuing Battle of Hanau, Wrede placed his troops in front of the forest of Lamboi, through which he expected that the French would retreat. He also positioned almost all of his cavalry on the left, placing it under the command of Field Marshal-Lieutenant Spleny. Despite his numeric inferiority, Napoleon sent forward a part of his men against Bavarians deployed in the forest before him, but the intervention of the Foot Guards was soon required. The Bavarians had fought alongside the French in the past and the sight of the fearsome Bearskins of French Guardsmen shook their morale and they abandoned their position in the forest after a brief fight. But, with the fire of a Bavarian grand battery upon them, the French infantry soon had to stop. Napoleon positioned General Le Noury's artillery in battery and brought in support General Drouot with the horse artillery of the Guard, as well as other pieces, constituting a grand battery of some 50 pieces that was soon able to respond adequately to the Austro-Bavarian cannonade. Nansouty, with the Guard Dragoons and Lancers, was instructed to protect this battery from the enemy and thus positioned his men behind the guns.

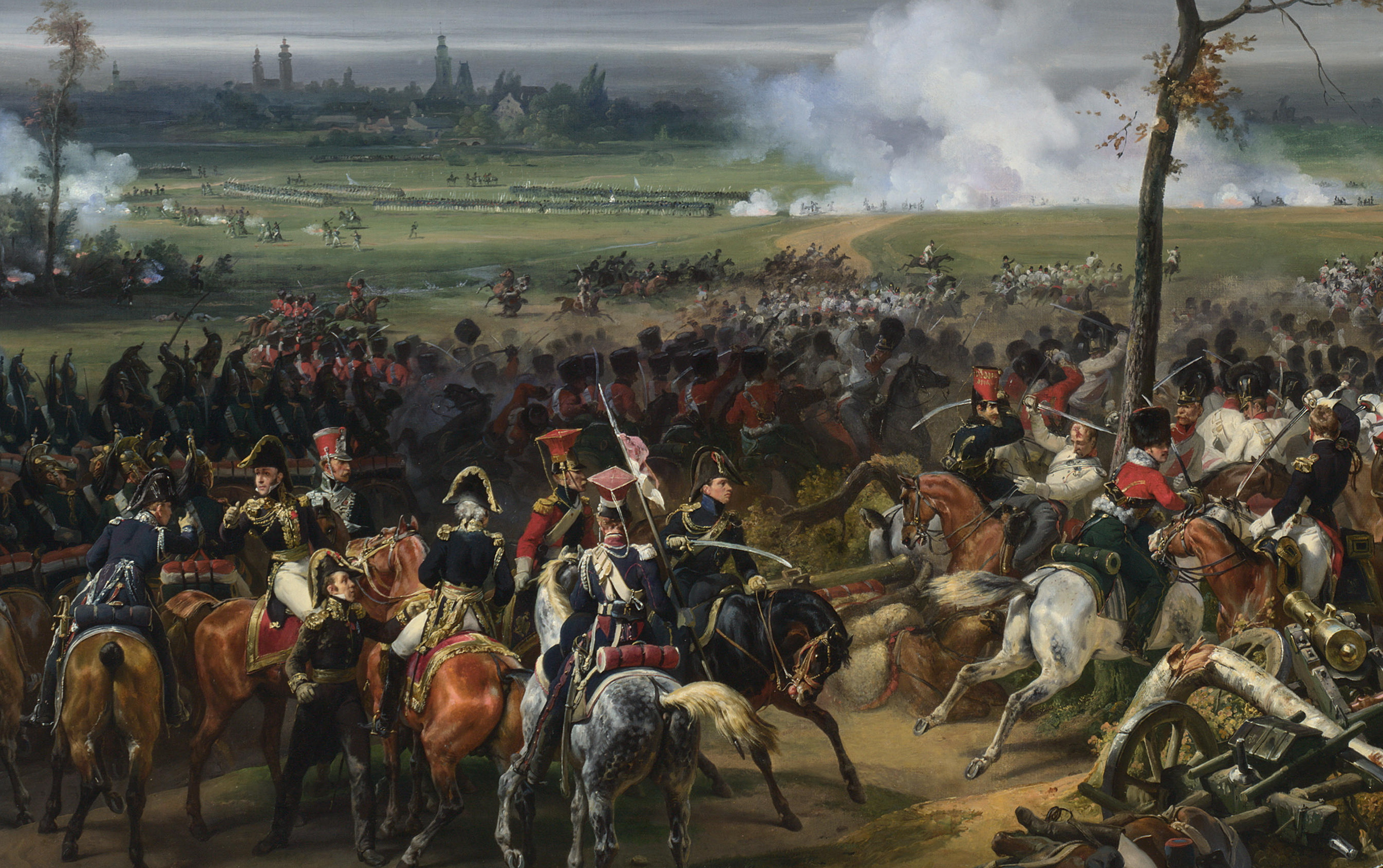
General Nansouty (his back to the viewer, recognizable due to his powdered hair and ponytail) giving instructions during the defence of the Grand Battery against Austro-Bavarian cavalry. His Guard cavalry is seen charging in the background. Detail of a painting by Horace Vernet.

Seeing this inauspicious development, Wrede sent his cavalry, no less than 7,000 men, to charge Drouot's grand battery. The steady French canister fire was devastating and many Coalition squadrons turned back to safety. Some of them did manage to get to the French guns and crossed the battery, with the Guard cavalry immediately countercharging and driving them off. With the gun line now out of danger, Nansouty, with the aid of Sebastiani's cuirassiers launched a pursuit of the repulsed enemy horse, encountering and breaking an Austrian cuirassier regiment, the Knesevich Dragoon regiment and two Bavarian chevaulegers regiments, all under the personal command of Field Marshal-Lieutenant Franz Splény de Miháldy. Then, with a manoeuvre resembling that of Kellermann at Marengo, Nansouty wheeled his men left and rushed onto the enemy infantry, breaking them. The Grenadiers-à-Cheval were in the thick of the fighting and, with an offensive comeback of the Bavarian cavalry, they were momentarily in a dangerous situation, but were duly rescued by the Gardes d'Honneur regiment. Nansouty then took his entire cavalry and broke the remaining enemy squares and cavalry, pushing some of these men into the Kinzig river. Meanwhile, Nansouty's action left Sebastiani free to silence the Bavarian grand battery, skilfully using Saint-Germain's cuirassier division and Exelmans's light division of his Corps. Nansouty received a light wound during this battle, but his role at Hanau is compared by a Russian author to that of Friedrich Wilhelm von Seydlitz at the Battle of Zorndorf.

==== Campaign in France ====
Nansouty's final campaign took place in 1814 on French soil, under bleak circumstances for the French, who saw huge Coalition armies invade France at the beginning of that year. During this campaign, his command, 5,000 Horse Guards, included the 1st and 2nd Chevau-légers Lanciers regiments, under General Édouard Colbert, the Chasseurs à Cheval, under General Laferrière, the Grenadiers à Cheval under General Guyot, the Dragons, under General Letort, as well as the entire Guard horse artillery.

These men soon saw action on 27 January, at the Battle of Brienne. Here, two companies of horse artillery, under an officer called Marin, a veteran of the campaigns in Italy and Egypt and personal favourite of the Emperor, were almost completely destroyed, with their guns and commander captured by the enemy. Napoleon was extremely irritated about the failure of the heavy cavalry of the Guard to protect these gunners. A further loss of cannon of the Guard artillery occurred at the Battle of La Rothière, a rare battlefield defeat for Napoleon. Here, a part of the Guard cavalry charged and was initially successful against enemy cavalry but, faced by steady ranks of the Russian and Prussian Guardsmen and with its flank threatened by enemy dragoons, it soon had to withdraw, leaving behind some of its cannon.

After rejoining the Emperor at Champaubert, Nansouty took part to the Battle of Montmirail, where he was at first instructed to protect the artillery. He then joined in the attack of the Guard infantry on the farm of Ėpine-au-Bois, where he suddenly wheeled left with his men and fell upon unprepared enemy infantry, charging home, routing these troops and subsequently pursuing the fugitives. This combined attack of the Guard resulted in a great number of prisoners and captured enemy guns, with Nansouty receiving a light wound in the process. A part of his men then took part to the Battle of Château-Thierry, where the Emperor ordered the Guard cavalry to make a turning move against the enemy left, and where Nansouty's subordinates General Letort and Colonel Curély brilliantly broke several enemy squares. Then, on 14 February, Nansouty personally led a brilliant charge at the Battle of Vauchamps, where he supported Grouchy in a cavalry action that decided the battle. Charging Blücher's men from the front, Nansouty allowed Grouchy to magnificently fall behind the enemy columns, which they both then sabred and crushed, with the Guard cavalry subsequently participating in a highly successful pursuit. Enemy losses reached a staggering 9,000–10,000 casualties, with 25 cannons lost. The Emperor was radiant following this battle, but, by nightfall, his mood changed when he found out of the loss of some Guard horse artillerymen. These men had been captured during their march and it was reported that their capture resulted from General Guyot (one of Nansouty's subordinates) failing to provide an escort and a guide for them. In Nansouty's presence, a fuming Napoleon summoned Guyot and then chastised him for the repeated losses in cannon during the previous battles, as well as for various other shortcomings, such as failing to properly escort the Emperor. After an angry tirade, Napoleon promptly axed Guyot and announced to Nansouty that General Exelmans would replace Guyot at the helm of his Old Guard heavy cavalry. This episode apparently strained relations between Emperor Napoleon and General Nansouty.

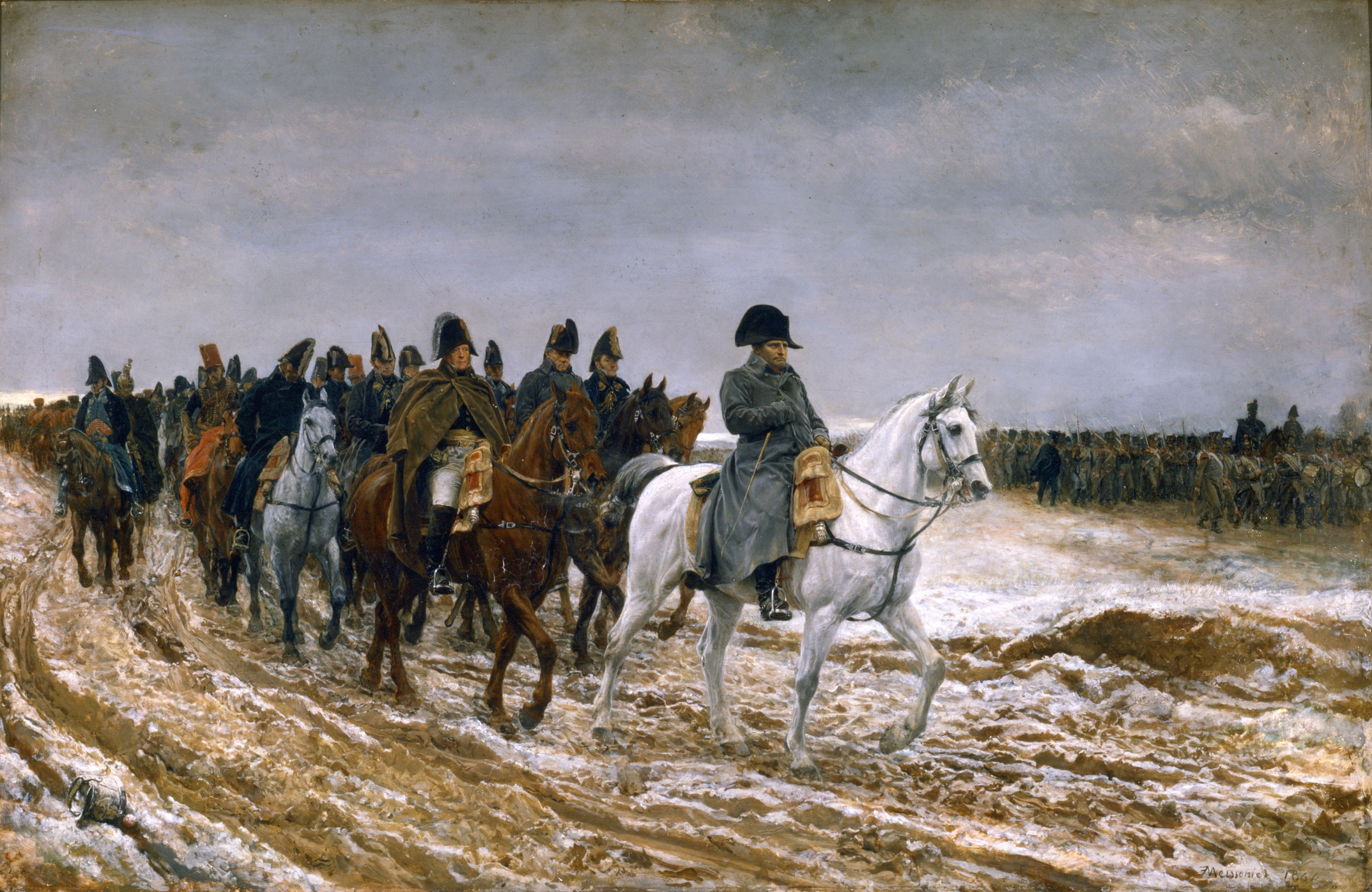
Napoleon during the 1814 military campaign in France. Painting by Jean-Louis-Ernest Meissonier

Always in the thick of the action during this campaign, on 24 February, Nansouty was present near the city of Troyes. Negotiations for an armistice were ongoing in a village nearby and, despite formal orders to continue the fighting, the two armies had ceased the combat. Nansouty then took his men and attacked enemy troops, charging into the streets of the village where the negotiations were taking place. The French envoy to the armistice talks, Monsieur de Flahaut saw this development and found Nansouty, bitterly protesting against the latter's action. Nansouty responded that the Emperor was doubtlessly aware that negotiations were indeed taking place there, but that he had orders to capture the position without further delay. On 27 February, the Emperor again moved against Blücher's Prussians, leaving a part of his forces near Troyes to observe the movement of Prince of Schwarzenberg's Austrian army. Nansouty, with the Guard cavalry, accompanied the Emperor, ensuring his protection and clearing his way after a bloody cavalry skirmish at Château-Thierry on 3 March. Another cavalry skirmish occurred on 5 March, with Nansouty repulsing a numerous enemy cavalry, 3,000–4,000 troopers, and capturing the bridge of Berry-au-Bac, over the Aisne, despite the enemy cannonade. Once across the Aisne with a few Polish lancer platoons, Nansouty launched a heroic pursuit, capturing enemy cannons and munitions, and taking a significant number of prisoners, among whom was the teenage Russian Prince Gagarin.

On 7 March, at the Battle of Craonne, another incident occurred, seemingly indicating that there had been some sort of disagreement between the General and the Emperor. As the battle was raging, General Belliard from the Emperor's staff came to Nansouty and told him that he had orders to relieve him of command should his health prevent him from exercising his duties. Nansouty responded that he was indeed ill, but that he was able to retain command. Although in unusually bad humour after this incident, Nansouty subsequently led a most brilliant action at Craonne. He was ordered to cross bogged and broken terrain, and climb a steep incline with his cavalry and artillery, in order to fall on the enemy's right flank. Managing to bring his cavalrymen on the ridge, Nansouty formed them in line and launched them against the enemy, pushing back in disorder two Russian battalions. Nansouty was again wounded during this action, but this injury was not very serious and he continued to energetically lead his men. Napoleon then allegedly ordered Nansouty to assault a redoubt, under the most murderous fire. Nonetheless, Nansouty ordered his men to halt and advanced alone towards the position. Asked to explain his behaviour, he replied that he would not send his men to die in vain and that he would be attacking alone. Napoleon at once revoked his order.

This was to be the last military engagement of Nansouty's long career. On 8 March, on the eve of the Battle of Laon, Nansouty was at Chavignon, nine kilometres from Laon, where the Emperor was also present and, although the circumstances of Nansouty's departure are unclear, it is certain that he left this village, and his command, that very day. Two days later, Napoleon wrote to his War Minister to inform him that General Nansouty's health did not allow him to exercise his military duties and that he was authorised to take sick leave in Paris. General Belliard had taken interim command of the Guard cavalry during the battle of Laon, with General Sébastiani subsequently given permanent command.

== Bourbon Restoration ==
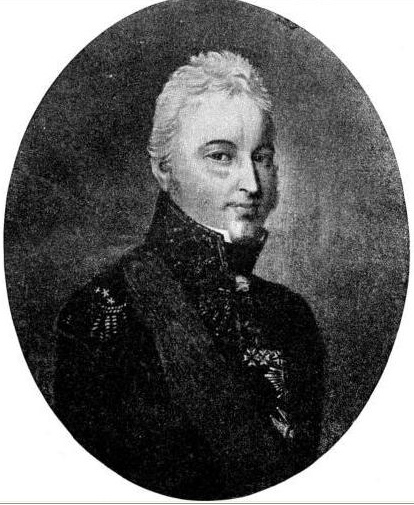
General Nansouty portrayed as Colonel-General of Dragoons, a position he held between January 1813 and until the Bourbon Restoration

Having left his command to General Belliard on 8 March, three days later, Nansouty was a part of a convoy of several officers, heading to Paris. On the road to the capital, they were attacked by a pulk of Cossacks, which managed to disperse the convoy's escort. Nansouty and his officers fought their way out sabre in hand and made a run for it towards the river Aisne. Reaching the riverbanks, the General got isolated and, as he was preparing to cross the river on horseback, his horse was shot under him, throwing the General to the ground. Nevertheless, he stood up and swam to the other bank of the river and safety. This event, as well as his tireless activity during the campaign, seem to suggest that his health was not the main reason of his departure from the army. It is also unlikely that the Emperor himself decided to replace him, given Belliard's tentative approach at the Battle of Craonne and this General's subsequent provisional status as commander, after Nansouty's departure. It is thus more likely that Nansouty resigned, following his disputes with the Emperor.

General Nansouty arrived in Paris and there he remained during the Bourbon Restoration that followed Napoleon's abdication. He was one of the first general officers to swear allegiance to the new King of France, Louis XVIII, who would bestow a number of honours upon the General. His gesture encouraged many other generals to also swear allegiance to the new regime. On 12 April 1814, Nansouty was named extraordinary commissioner of the King in the 2nd military division, then, on 20 April, became a member of the commission that was in charge of the dissolution of Napoleon's Imperial Guard. He was given the distinction of Knight of the Order of Saint Louis on 1 June and on 6 July he was called to a command in the Military Household of the King of France, as captain-lieutenant of the 1st company of musketeers (grey musketeers). Despite these positions, Nansouty's financial situation declined severely under the Restoration. The General had had a highly honourable behaviour during the Napoleonic Wars and, unlike some of his fellow Napoleonic Generals, had drawn no revenues from pillaging. He had also been living a lofty and very costly lifestyle, which he considered normal for a nobleman such as himself. Nansouty had been earning a high revenue from his various positions during the Empire and additionally Napoleon was constantly paying high endowments to his best generals. Napoleonic endowments aside, Nansouty's salaries during the first four months of 1814 had brought him no less than 104,000 Francs, but, under the Bourbons, his dignity as Colonel-General of dragoons had been suppressed and transformed into an honorific title of Inspector of dragoons, leaving him with only a 25,000 Francs salary as captain-lieutenant in the King's Military Household.

== Death and resting place ==
By the second half of 1814, following his long and almost continuous campaigns throughout Europe during the last ten years, the health of General Nansouty badly deteriorated. He was suffering from his wounds, some of which were very recent, but, above all from war fatigue. On his death bed, he is recorded to have said: "I have carefully reflected upon all my action ever since I was born and in all my life, I have not done anyone wrong." He is also said to have reasserted his Christian faith and to have asked that his son be recommended for the King's protection, as a favour for his services. Just before dying, he told his son that his heritage would be to follow his example and live an honourable and blameless life. General Count Étienne-Marie-Antoine-Champion de Nansouty died on 12 February 1815 in Paris, leaving behind his wife and their only son. A pension of 6,000 Francs per year was granted to the General's widow by the King of France. His final resting place is at the Père Lachaise Cemetery in Paris, division 27. The engraving on his tombstone reads:

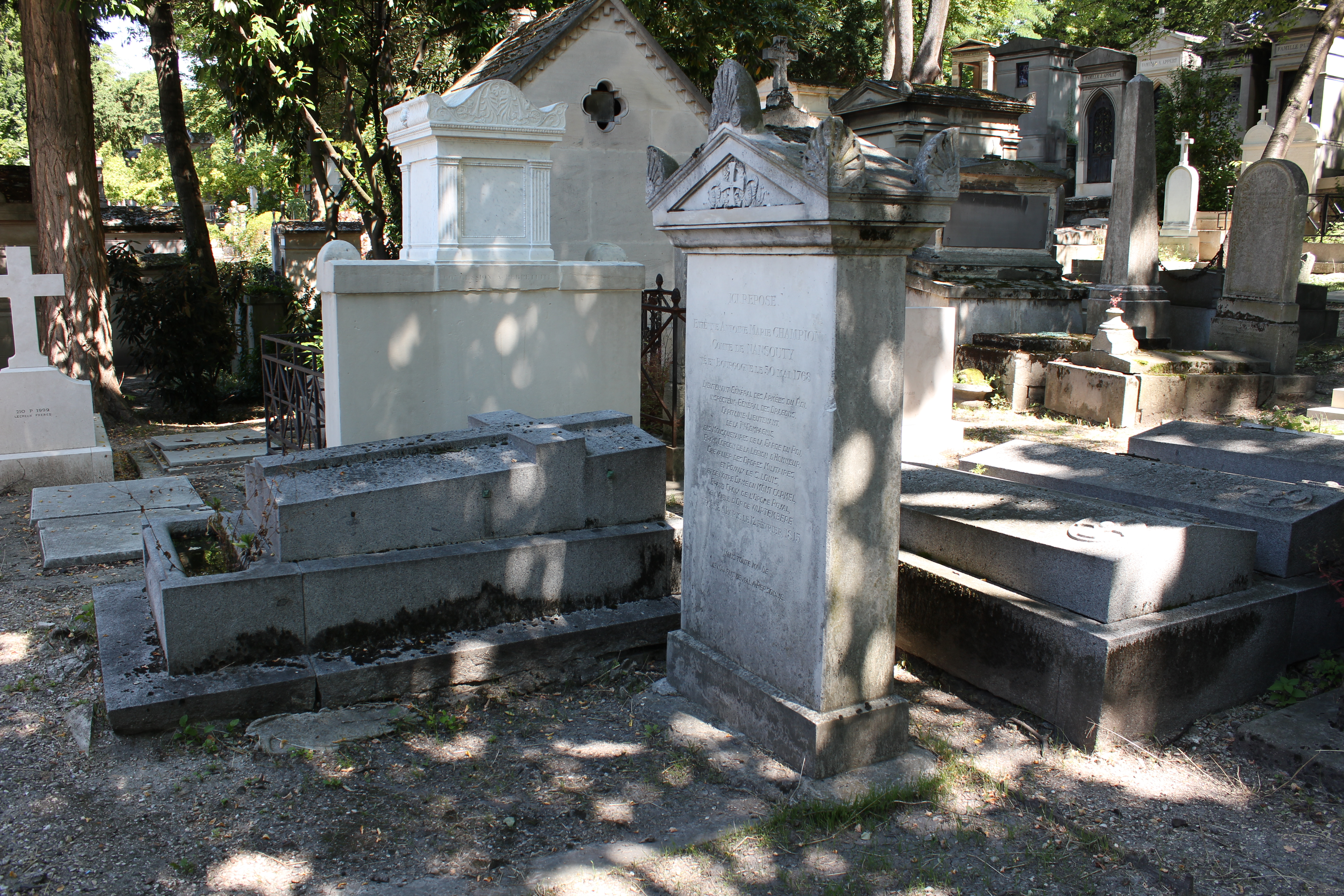
Tomb stone of General Count Nansouty at the Père Lachaise Cemetery in Paris

Here rests Étienne Marie Antoine Champion
Comte de Nansouty
born in Bourgogne on 30 May 1768
Lieutenant-General of the King's Armies,
Inspector General of Dragoons,
Captain-Lieutenant
of the 1st Company
of the King's Guard Musketeers,
Grand Cordon of the Legion of Honour,
Knight of the Military
and Royal Orders of S. Louis
and of Notre Dame du Mont Carmel,
Grand Cross of the Royal Order
of the Golden Eagle of Württemberg
Deceased in Paris on 12 February 1815
"In all my life, I have not done any harm to anyone."

The name NANSOUTY is inscribed under the Arc de Triomphe in Paris.

== Family ==
The Nansouty family was ancient Burgundy nobility and it was intimately linked to the history of this region, to which it gave several esteemed magistrates and soldiers throughout the centuries. One of its illustrious members, Seigneur de Nansouty was instrumental in ensuring the allegiance of Burgundy to King Henri IV and was rewarded by the monarch for his fidelity by being named state counselor.

General Count de Nansouty was the first child of Jean-Baptiste-Pierre-Charles Champion de Nansouty (born 1718 in Dijon, died 1785 in Bordeaux) and his wife Antoinette Hélène Harpailler (born ca. 1740), who also had Pierrette-Adélaïde Champion de Nansouty (1771–1849). On 27 September 1802, General Nansouty married Jeanne-Françoise Adélaïde Gravier de Vergennes (1781–1849), the niece of a former minister of Louis XVI, Charles Gravier, comte de Vergennes. Her parents were: Charles Xavier Gravier de Vergennes, 1751–1794, and Elisabeth Adélaïde Françoise de Bastard, 1763–1808. General Count de Nansouty and his wife had only one child, Étienne Champion de Nansouty (1803–1865), who, having followed his father's and grandfather's footsteps in the military, rose to the rank of squadron commander, but then resigned from the army. General Count Nansouty also had a nephew, Charles-Marie-Étienne Champion Dubois de Nansouty (1815–1895), who saw a successful military career and who later rose to the rank of general of division.

== Considerations ==
As a commander, General Nansouty is reported to have been a man of spirit but also to have had an excessive inclination towards sarcasm, which was damaging to his reputation and made him a number of enemies. His few months spent in Spain in 1808, where he commanded the orderly officers of the Emperor and the aides-de-camp of the senior generals of the General Staff, seem to have acquired him an unwanted reputation for mockery on the service, to such a point that one of his subordinates reported that "no one ever knew when he was joking and when he was serious." When it came to military matters though, Nansouty's posture became extremely imposing, concise and tough. A perfectionist, with a keen eye and impeccable knowledge of his arm, he was shocked whenever he saw his cavalry manoeuvres mishandled and then he became sarcastic, at times even insulting his subordinates. However, whenever he went too far with his reprimands, he was noticeably displeased with himself and remorseful, trying to offer reparation to the person he had insulted. This behaviour seems to have been recurrent. His mood seems to have been particularly bad during his last days of service, in 1814, after he had received a number of light wounds in a short period of time, and foremost, after he had fallen out with the Emperor. During this period, he severely mistreated one of his squadron commanders for not executing his order fast enough, and even sacked his chief of staff, Colonel de la Loyère, for a minor fault.

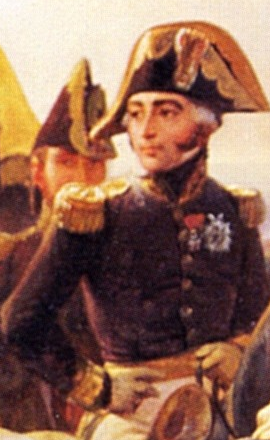
General Nansouty depicted in Horace Vernet's painting "Napoleon at Friedland"

Nansouty's character as a proud and independent commander was apparent throughout his career and his conceitedly assertive nature, quite typical of the great cavalry commanders of the time, led to several clashes with his peers. At least one such incident almost led to a duel with another senior cavalry commander, in front of their men. It occurred on 11 July 1809, a few days after the Battle of Wagram, and opposed him to General Arrighi de Casanova, the commander of the 3rd heavy cavalry division. Both Nansouty and Arrighi adamantly claimed for their respective troops exclusive rights to use a small farm pond that they had found. Both men refused to give way and engaged in a heated argument, to such a point that they almost came to a duel in order to settle the matter. In the end, the more senior Nansouty won out and just after the incident, one of Arrighi's cuirassiers erected a sign sarcastically saying "Nansouty's pond".

Indeed, at times, his sarcasm was directed even at his superiors, with Nansouty clashing with the more senior Grouchy at the Battle of Friedland. Nevertheless, Grouchy later recognised that the actions of Nansouty's division throughout the battle were "glorious". In 1809, Nansouty famously responded to Napoleon's criticism after the Battle of Wagram by saying: "It is not Your Majesty at any rate who can teach me how to handle cavalry." Three years later, during the campaign in Russia, when Murat, King of Naples complained to him about the lack of resistance of the horses, Nansouty retorted: "Oh yes, Sire, this is because they lack patriotism." At the Battle of Craonne, in 1814, one day before resigning, he was recorded to have refused to execute Napoleon's order to assault a redoubt, a move which he saw as a death sentence to his men. Instead, Nansouty told the Emperor: "I am going alone. There is nothing but death there and I will not lead these brave soldiers to it."

His behaviour on campaign can only be described as perfectly honourable and at times humane, a trait which was illustrated during the French Revolutionary Wars, when he spared no effort to protect captured émigrés from the wrath of the Revolutionary radicals in the army. He also showed respect for occupied populations and never tolerated pillaging nor violence from his men. As a sign a gratitude, he was offered gifts several times but he was often seen refusing and sending them back. While on campaign in Tyrol, he was recorded to have accepted a large sum of money but he immediately distributed it to the local hospitals. Further evidence of his humanity was the care that he displayed for the lives and well-being of his men, whom he was always reluctant to sacrifice for the sake of glory.

Overall as a heavy cavalry commander, Nansouty was one of the best men available during the Napoleonic Wars. Precise, methodical, with perfect knowledge of cavalry tactics, he was better than any other in preparing his attack dispositions. He was however less daring than the likes of Lasalle, Montbrun or Kellermann, which did not prevent him from leading some of the most memorable cavalry charges of the Napoleonic Wars. It has also been said that he reacted with "calculated slowness" when placed under the command of Murat. His talents for up-keeping and training his troops seemed to surpass that of his peers. This was illustrated right from the start of the Napoleonic Wars, with the organisation of the cavalry reserve in the Grande Armée, under Marshal Murat. The command of the various units of this reserve was given to some of the best cavalry commanders available, including Jean-Joseph Ange d'Hautpoul, Louis Klein, Marc Antoine de Beaumont, Frédéric Henri Walther, Louis Baraguey d'Hilliers and Édouard Jean Baptiste Milhaud. Despite the fame and quality of these commanders, it was Nansouty's six-regiment division that acquired the reputation of being the best serviced and most exact in its manoeuvres. He was also a commander who had his men continually manoeuvre during a battle, believing that this would distract them from the danger that they were facing.

Nansouty's success at Austerlitz, Friedland, Eckmühl, Essling, Borodino, Hanau, Montmirail, Vauchamps or Craonne, contributed to some of the most decisive victories of the French Empire, eliciting comparisons with the Prussian cavalry commander Friedrich Wilhelm von Seydlitz.

== Sources ==
- Arnold, James R.: Napoleon conquers Austria: the 1809 campaign for Vienna, Praeger Publishers, 1995, ISBN 0-275-94694-0
- Castle, Ian: Aspern and Wagram 1809, Chandler, David G (General Editor), Campaign Series 33, Osprey Military, 1994, ISBN 1-85532-366-4
- (in French) Courcelles, Jean-Baptiste-Pierre Jullien de (Chevalier de Courcelles): Dictionnaire historique et biographique des généraux Français depuis le 11ème siècle jusqu'en 1823, 8th volume, L'Auteur, 1823 1
- (in French) Fierro, Alfredo; Palluel-Guillard, André; Tulard, Jean: Histoire et Dictionnaire du Consulat et de l'Empire, Éditions Robert Laffont, 2002, ISBN 2-221-05858-5
- (in French) Garnier, Jacques: Friedland, une victoire pour la paix, Éditions Napoléon Ier, 2009
- (in French) Gotteri, Nicole: Grands dignitaires du Premier Empire, NEL, 1990, ISBN 2-7233-0411-6
- (in French) Hourtoulle, François-Guy: Wagram, L'apogée de l'Empire, Histoire & Collections, 2002, ISBN 2-913903-32-0
- (in French) La Grande Armée, Collection Trésor du Patrimoine, 2004, ISBN 2-912511-40-2
- (in French) Mir, Jean-Pierre: Hanau et Montmirail, La Garde donne et vainc, Histoire et Collections, 2009, ISBN 978-2-35250-086-5
- (in French) Naulet, Frédéric: Wagram, 5–6 juillet 1809, Une victoire chèrement acquise, Collections Grandes Batailles, Napoléon Ier Éditions, 2009.
- (in French) Pigeard, Alain: Dictionnaire de la Grande Armée, Tallandier, Bibliothèque Napoléonienne, 2004, ISBN 2-84734-009-2
- (in French) Pigeard, Alain: Dictionnaire des batailles de Napoléon, Tallandier, Bibliothèque Napoléonienne, 2004, ISBN 2-84734-073-4
- (in French) Pigeard, Alain: La Garde Impériale, Tallandier, Bibliothèque Napoléonienne, 2005, ISBN 2-84734-177-3
- Rothenberg, Gunther Erich: The Emperor's last victory, Napoleon and the battle of Wagram, Cassel, 2004, ISBN 0-304-36711-7
- Smith, Digby G.: Great Cavalry Charges of the Napoleonic Wars, Greenhill Books London, 2003, ISBN 1-85367-541-5
- (in French) Sokolov, Oleg: L'armée de Napoléon, Éditions Commios, 2005, ISBN 2-9518364-1-4
- (in French) Thoumas, Charles A.: Les grands cavaliers du Premier Empire, Série II, Ellibron Classics, 2006, ISBN 0-543-96047-1
- (in French) Tulard, Jean: Dictionnaire Napoléon; Librairie Artème Fayard, 1999, ISBN 2-213-60485-1
