= Antoine-Louis Decrest de Saint-Germain =

French general (1761–1835)

- Born: 8 December 1761; Paris, France
- Died: 4 October 1835 (aged 73); Neuilly, France
- Military career
- Allegiance: Kingdom of France, Kingdom of France (1791-1792), French First Republic, First French Empire, Bourbon Restoration
- Branch: Cavalry
- Service years: 1778-1818
- Rank: General of Division
- Conflicts: French Revolutionary Wars; Napoleonic Wars
- Awards: Baron, later Count of the Empire
- Other work: Inspector general of cavalry

Antoine-Louis Decrest, comte de Saint-Germain, Count de Saint-Germain and of the Empire (French pronunciation: [ɑ̃twan lwi dəkʁɛ də sɛ̃ ʒɛʁmɛ̃]; born 8 December 1761 in Paris, died 4 October 1835 in Neuilly) was a French soldier of the French Revolutionary Wars, who later rose to the top military rank of General of Division, taking part to the Napoleonic Wars as a commander of cavalry.

== Revolutionary Wars ==
Born in Paris on 8 December 1761, Antoine-Louis Decrest de Saint-Germain descended from a noble family of the Ancien Régime. In 1778, he joined the "Lunéville" gendarmerie, but was expelled from this arm in 1784 for indiscipline and transferred to the cavalry branch. At the outbreak of the Revolutionary Wars in 1792, he held the rank of captain and was sent to serve in the Army of the North and then in Army of the Ardennes. In April 1794, he was arrested due to his aristocratic ascendance and was reintegrated in the army only in August 1795, but, in exchange, was immediately promoted to the rank of colonel and given the command of a chasseurs à cheval regiment. In this capacity, Saint-Germain fought in campaigns on the Rhine and received a first battle wound when a cannonball broke his right leg on 20 September 1796. He recovered and resumed his duties but was again wounded in action a few months later, at the battle of Wiesbaden (22 April 1797), suffering a broken arm. Placed under the command of General Michel Ney, Saint-Germain took part to the battle of Hohenlinden on 3 December 1800.

== Napoleonic Wars and beyond ==
In April 1805, Saint-Germain was named general of brigade and given a command in Etienne de Nansouty's 1st heavy cavalry division and thus campaigned with the Grande Armée during the War of the Third Coalition and War of the Fourth Coalition during 1805–1806. A Baron of the Empire in January 1809, Saint-Germain led a brigade of Nansouty's cuirassiers at the battle of Aspern-Essling and was promoted to general of division in July 1809. In 1812, he took part to the Campaign in Russia, receiving a wound at the battle of Borodino. In September 1813, Saint-Germain was created a Count of the Empire and took part to the battle of Hanau, where he had a hand in forcing the passage of the debris of the Grande Armée towards France. During the 1814 campaign in France, he led several noted cavalry actions. During the Bourbon Restoration he fared well and in 1818 was named Inspector general of cavalry.

The name Saint-Germain is one of the names inscribed under the Arc de Triomphe in Paris.

== Sources ==
- Fierro, Alfredo; Palluel-Guillard, André; Tulard, Jean - "Histoire et Dictionnaire du Consulat et de l'Empire”, Éditions Robert Laffont, ISBN 2-221-05858-5
