= Jean-Nicolas Curély =

French cavalry leader (1774–1827)

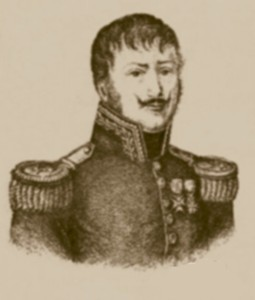
Jean-Nicolas Curély.

Jean-Nicolas Curély (c. 1774–1827), French cavalry leader, was the son of a poor peasant of Lorraine.

Joining, in 1793, a regiment of hussars, he served with great distinction as private and as sous-officier in the Rhine campaigns from 1794 to 1800. He was, however, still a non-commissioned officer of twelve years service, when at Afflenz (November 12, 1805) he attacked and defeated, with twenty-five men, a whole regiment of Austrian cavalry. This brilliant feat of arms won him the grade of sous-lieutenant, and the reputation of being one of the men of the future.

The next two campaigns of the Grande Armée gained him two more promotions, and as a captain of hussars he performed, in the campaign of Wagram, a feat of even greater daring than the affair of Afflenz. Entrusted with despatches for the viceroy of Italy, Curély, with forty troopers, made his way through the Austrian lines, reconnoitred everywhere, even in the very headquarters-camp of the archduke John, and finally accomplished his mission in safety. This exploit, only to be compared to the famous raids of the American Civil War, and almost unparalleled in European war, gained him the grade of chef d'escadrons, in which for some years he served in the Peninsular War.

Under Gouvion St Cyr he took part in the Russian War of 1812, and in 1813 was promoted colonel. In the campaign of France (1814) Curély, now general of brigade, commanded a brigade of improvised cavalry, and succeeded in infusing into this unpromising material some of his own daring spirit. His regiments distinguished themselves in several combats, especially at the battle of Arcis-sur-Aube.

The Restoration government looked with suspicion on the most dashing cavalry leader of the younger generation, and in 1815 Curély, who during the Hundred Days had rallied to his old leader, was placed on the retired list. Withdrawing to the little estate of Jaulny (near Thiaucourt), which was his sole property, he lived in mournful retirement, which was saddened still further when in 1824 he was suddenly deprived of his rank. This last blow hastened his death.

Curély, had he arrived at high command earlier, would have been ranked with Lasalle and Montbrun, but his career, later than theirs in beginning, was ended by the fall of Napoleon. His devoted friend, De Brack, in his celebrated work Light Cavalry Outposts, considers Curély incomparable as a leader of light cavalry, and the portrait of Curély to be found in its pages is justly ranked as one of the masterpieces of military literature. The general himself left but a modest manuscript, which was left for a subsequent generation to publish.
