= Battle of Neumarkt-Sankt Veit =

1809 battle of the War of the Fifth Coalition

- Part of the War of the Fifth Coalition
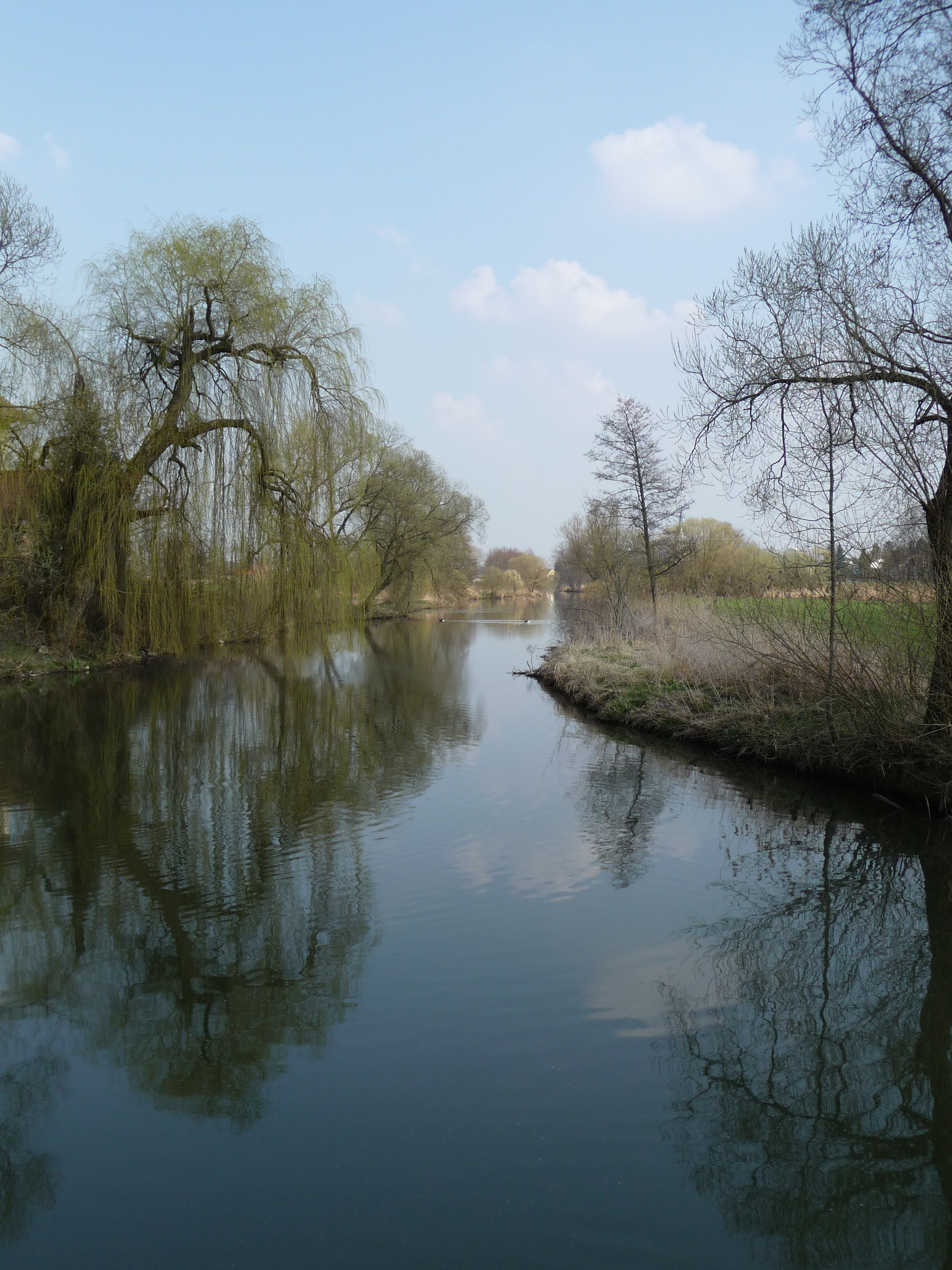
- Rott River near Oberdietfurt, 10 km downstream. The Bavarians suffered heavy losses while retreating across the Rott.
Date	24 April 1809
Location	Neumarkt-Sankt Veit, modern-day Germany 48°22′N 12°30′E
Result	Austrian victory

Belligerents
Austrian Empire	(France) First French Empire; Kingdom of Bavaria

Commanders and leaders
(Austrian Empire) Johann von Hiller (Austrian Empire) Archduke Louis (Austrian Empire) Michael von Kienmayer	(France) Jean Bessières (Kingdom of Bavaria) Karl von Wrede (France) Gabriel Molitor

Strength
27,000 to 28,000	18,000–20,661 (Note: Add strengths of Jacquinot, Molitor, Marulaz, and Wrede. Casualties unknown for 19–23 April.)

Casualties and losses
800–1,000	2,500–2,602

War of the Fifth Coalition
current battle
Napoleon in command
Napoleon not in command

The Battle of Neumarkt-Sankt Veit on 24 April 1809 saw a Franco-Bavarian force led by Marshal Jean-Baptiste Bessières face an Austrian Empire army commanded by Johann von Hiller. Hiller's numerically superior force won a victory over the Allied troops, forcing Bessières to retreat to the west. Neumarkt-Sankt Veit is located ten kilometers north of Mühldorf and 33 kilometers southeast of Landshut in Bavaria.

On 10 April 1809, Archduke Charles, Duke of Teschen's surprise invasion of the Kingdom of Bavaria put the Grande Armée of Emperor Napoleon I of France at a disadvantage. On 19 April, Charles failed to take advantage of his opportunities and Napoleon struck back with savage force against the Austrian left wing under Hiller. After battles on 20 and 21 April, Hiller's troops were driven into a headlong retreat to the southeast.

Having temporarily disposed of Hiller, Napoleon turned north with his main army against Archduke Charles. On 22 and 23 April, the Franco-Germans defeated Charles' army and forced it to withdraw to the north bank of the Danube. Meanwhile, Napoleon sent Bessières to pursue the Austrian left wing with minor forces. Not knowing that Charles had been defeated, Hiller turned back upon his pursuer, defeating Bessières near Neumarkt-Sankt Veit. Once he found that he was alone on the south bank facing Napoleon's main army, Hiller retreated rapidly to the east in the direction of Vienna.

== Background ==
On 10 April 1809, Archduke Charles invaded the Kingdom of Bavaria with 209,000 Austrian soldiers and 500 artillery pieces. A set of orders from Emperor Napoleon in Paris was transmitted poorly and misunderstood by Marshal Louis Alexandre Berthier. By the time Napoleon arrived at the front on the 17th, his Franco-German army invited defeat in detail. On the morning of the 19th, Charles gained a position in which he might have severely punished Marshal Louis Davout's isolated III Corps. Instead, Davout escaped defeat in the hard-fought Battle of Teugen-Hausen.

On 20 April, the Austrian left wing was strung-out on a 13 kilometer front behind the Abens River from Mainburg in the south to Biburg in the north. The left wing consisted of the V Armeekorps under Feldmarschall-Leutnant Archduke Louis of Austria, the VI Armeekorps led by Feldmarschall-Leutnant Hiller, the small II Reserve Armeekorps commanded by Feldmarschall-Leutnant Michael von Kienmayer, and a detachment from the III Armeekorps. In total, there were about 42,000 Austrians. Napoleon launched 55,000 troops at his enemies in the Battle of Abensberg, inflicting 6,710 casualties, and forcing them to retreat. In command of the left wing since his arrival that morning, Hiller elected to continue withdrawing southeast toward Landshut, thus separating Hiller's three corps from Archduke Charles' main body near Regensburg.

Napoleon beat Hiller again in the Battle of Landshut on 21 April, seizing a crossing over the Isar River and driving the Austrians farther to the southeast. Until 2:30 am on 22 April, Napoleon mistakenly believed that Hiller's three corps represented the main Austrian army. When he realized his error, he sent most of his troops marching north to crush Archduke Charles. On 22 April, the Franco-Germans defeated Charles at the Battle of Eckmühl and forced him to withdraw through Regensburg to the north bank of the Danube the following day. Napoleon instructed Bessières to pursue Hiller and placed him in charge of one reinforced cavalry division and two infantry divisions.

The bulk of Hiller's force, numbering 27,000 to 28,000 troops, lay near Mühldorf and Neuötting on the Inn River at noon on 23 April. A 10,000-strong division under Feldmarschall-Leutnant Franz Jellacic held Munich. Feldmarschall-Leutnant Dedovich's brigade from the IV Armeekorps, which had been blockading Passau, was assigned to Hiller's command and moved to Braunau am Inn. Hiller noticed that the French pursuit had slackened on the 22nd and 23rd and decided to counterattack. A letter from Emperor Francis I urging him to help defend Archduke Charles' south flank strengthened the left wing commander's resolve. Neither the emperor nor Hiller realized that Charles had withdrawn to the north bank of the Danube.

== Battle ==
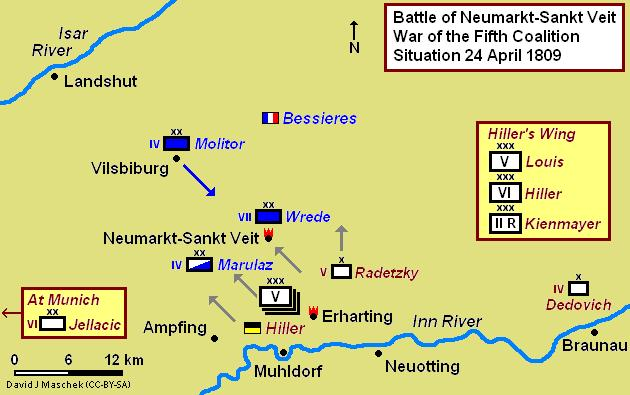
Battle of Neumarkt-Sankt Veit, 24 April 1809

On the night of 22 April, Napoleon instructed Bessières to advance with Lieutenant General Karl Philipp von Wrede's Bavarian division from the VII Corps, General of Division Gabriel Jean Joseph Molitor's French infantry division from the IV Corps, and General of Brigade Jacob François Marulaz's IV Corps cavalry division. The emperor planned for the pursuit to cross the Inn and capture Braunau am Inn. On the 24th, Napoleon ordered Marshal François Joseph Lefebvre, the commander of VII Corps, to take the division of Lieutenant General the Crown Prince of Bavaria to recapture Munich from Jellacic. If necessary, he could call on Lieutenant General Deroy's Bavarian division also. Bessières, with Wrede's division, reached Neumarkt-Sankt Veit on 22 April. From there he sent Marulaz to probe toward the Inn River.

Late on 23 April, Hiller recrossed the Inn at Mühldorf and ordered Jellacic to advance from Munich toward Landshut. That day, Marulaz's advance guard marched southeast toward the Inn. A short distance north of Mühldorf at the village of Erharting, the 3rd Chasseurs à Cheval Regiment collided with Hiller's advance elements. The French horsemen were quickly driven back on two supporting units, the 19th Chasseurs à Cheval and an infantry battalion. Marulaz pulled back in the direction of Neumarkt-Sankt Veit.

On the morning of 24 April, Hiller advanced in three columns. His right column of 12 infantry battalions and nine cavalry squadrons attacked Wrede at 8:00 am. The Bavarian general held high ground to the southeast of Neumarkt with 10 battalions and eight squadrons. On the far right, an advance guard under Joseph Radetzky von Radetz felt its way to the north toward Landau an der Isar. Hiller's center column struck Marulaz's position and drove the cavalry back. In addition to his own division, Marulaz had General of Brigade Charles Claude Jacquinot's light cavalry brigade from the III Corps attached.

In the face of Austrian assaults, Wrede held his ground until noon. Seeing that the opposing flanking columns threatened to envelop his Bavarians, Bessières ordered a retreat about 1:00 pm. By this time, Molitor had arrived from Vilsbiburg and sent two regiments to cover Wrede's retreat while holding his other two regiments in reserve. Nevertheless, the Austrians continued to press the Bavarians hard and captured Neumarkt at about 3:00 pm. Wrede's soldiers suffered significant losses as they struggled across the Rott River. Once his enemies got across the Rott, which runs eastward into the Inn near Schärding, Hiller called off the battle. Bessières conducted an orderly retreat to Vilsbiburg.

== Result ==
Francis Loraine Petre gives Austrian casualties as 776 killed and wounded, plus 122 captured. He writes that Wrede lost 586 killed and wounded. Digby Smith lists 1,692 Bavarians killed and wounded, plus another 910 missing or captured. Smith notes that the Austrians lost 800 casualties. To Smith's total must be added Bessières' reported losses of 200 among the cavalry. On the night of 24 April, Hiller got word of the defeat of Archduke Charles and immediately pulled back to Neuötting.

Jellacic was unable to carry out his orders to threaten Landshut. He found out about Archduke Charles' defeat and evacuated Munich on the evening of the 23rd. When Jellacic got Hiller's orders of the 23rd, he tried to reoccupy Munich. Before he reached the Bavarian capital, he received new orders from Hiller instructing him to retreat to Salzburg. Eventually, General of Division Paul Grenier's corps from the Army of Italy crushed Jellacic's wandering division on 25 May at the Battle of Sankt Michael in Styria.

When Napoleon received news of the Battle of Neumarkt, he sent Marshal Jean Lannes with a corps of 25,000 to support Bessières. By this time Hiller was in full retreat to the east. The French emperor directed André Masséna and the IV Corps to take the road to Passau, while Bessières and Lannes (who now led the II Corps) took a route farther south. The next major action was the Battle of Ebelsberg on 3 May.

== Order of battle ==
=== Austrian forces ===
Johann von Hiller

Returns from 20 March 1809, less detachments
Left Wing: Feldmarschall-Leutnant Johann von Hiller

- VI Armeekorps: Feldmarschall-Leutnant Johann von Hiller. Less Jellacic's detachment.
  - Reserve Artillery: Feldmarschall-Leutnant Karl von Rouvroy
    - Three 12-pdr position batteries (18 guns), 6-pdr position battery (6 guns)
  - Division: Feldmarschall-Leutnant Friedrich Kottulinsky
    - Brigade: General-Major Otto Hohenfeld
      - Klebek IR # 14 (3 bns), Jordis IR # 59 (3 bns), 6-pdr brigade battery (8 guns)
    - Brigade: General-Major Nikolaus Weissenwolf
      - Deutschmeister IR # 4 (3 bns), Kerpen IR # 49 (3 bns), 6-pdr brigade battery (8 guns)
    - Artillery: 6-pdr position battery (6 guns)
  - Division: Feldmarschall-Leutnant Franz Jellacic (Detached at Munich)
    - Brigade: General-Major Konstantin Ettingshausen
      - Esterhazy IR # 32 (3 bns), De Vaux IR # 45 (3 bns), 6-pdr brigade battery (8 guns)
    - Brigade: General-Major Karl Dollmayer von Provenchères. Jellacic had exchanged Hoffmeister's brigade for Dollmayer's at the beginning of the war.
      - Warasdin-Kreutzer Grenz IR # 5 (2 bns), 3-pdr Grenz brigade battery (8 guns)
      - O'Reilly Chevau-léger Regt # 3 (8 sqns), 6-pdr cavalry battery (6 guns)
    - Artillery: 6-pdr position battery (6 guns)
  - Light Division: Feldmarschall-Leutnant Karl von Vincent
    - Brigade: General-Major Josef Hoffmeister
      - Benjowsky IR # 31 (3 bns), Splenyi IR # 51 (3 bns), 6-pdr brigade battery (8 guns)
    - Brigade: General-Major Armand von Nordmann
      - Warasdin-St. George Grenz IR # 6 (2 bns), 3-pdr Grenz brigade battery (8 guns)
      - Rosenberg Chevau-léger Regt # 6 (8 sqns), Liechtenstein Hussars Regt # 7 (8 sqns), 6-pdr cavalry battery (6 guns)
      - 4th, 5th, 6th Vienna Freiwilligers Battalions. These units joined Hiller at Moosburg on 18 April. They belonged to Dollmayer's brigade, but since Dollmayer was at Munich, they never joined it.

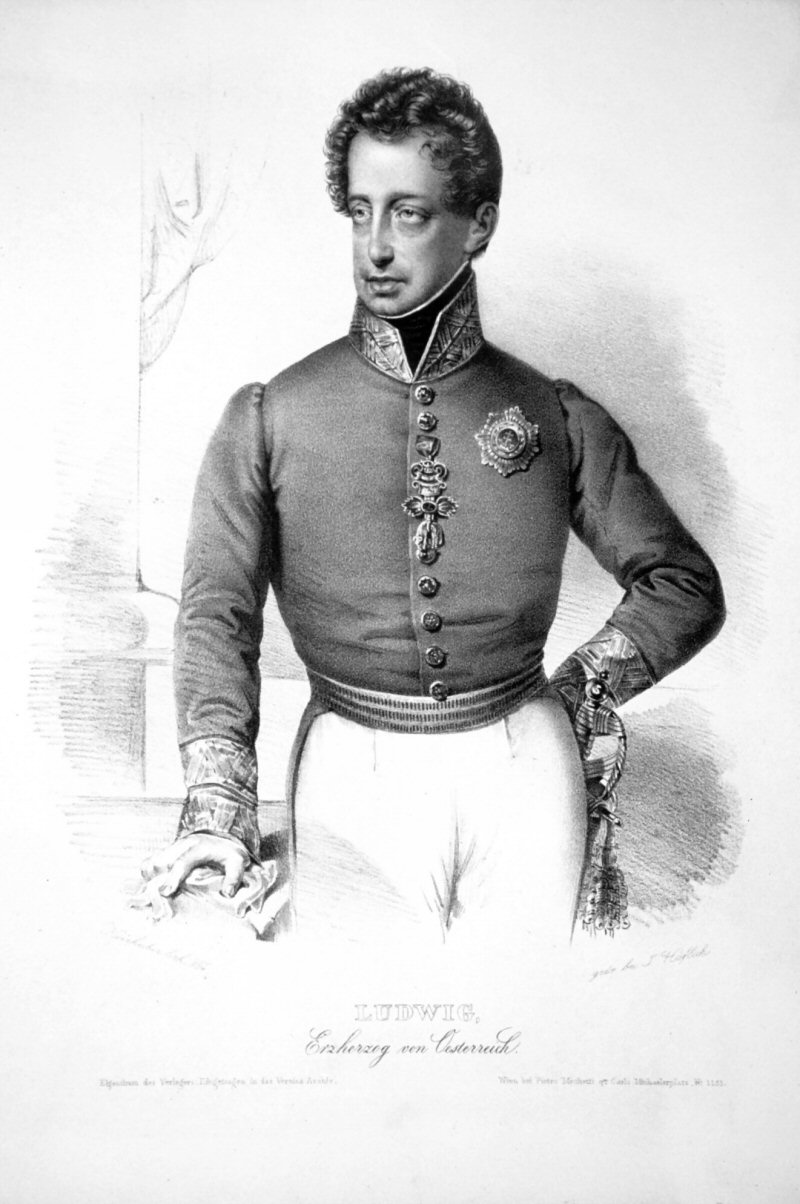
Archduke Louis

- V Armeekorps: Feldmarschall-Leutnant Archduke Louis
  - Reserve Artillery: Major Adam Pfefferkorn
    - Two 12-pdr position batteries (12 guns), 6-pdr cavalry battery (6 guns)
  - Brigade III Corps:
    - Kaiser IR # 1 (3 bns), Lindenau IR # 29 (3 bns), 6-pdr brigade battery (8 guns)
  - Division: Feldmarschall-Leutnant Karl Friedrich von Lindenau (Detached to I Reserve Armeekorps)
  - Division: Feldmarschall-Leutnant Prince Heinrich XV of Reuss-Plauen
    - Brigade: General-Major Frederick Bianchi, Duke of Casalanza
      - Duka IR # 39 (3 bns), Gyulai IR # 60 (3 bns), 6-pdr brigade battery (8 guns)
    - Brigade: General-Major Franz Johann Schulz von Rothacker
      - Beaulieu IR # 58 (3 bns), 1st, 2nd, 3rd Vienna Freiwilligers Battalions
    - Artillery: 6-pdr position battery (6 guns)
  - Light Division: Feldmarschall-Leutnant Emmanuel von Schustekh-Herve
    - Brigade: General-Major Joseph, Baron von Mesko de Felsö-Kubiny
      - Broder Grenz IR # 7 (2 bns), Kienmayer Hussar Regt # 8 (8 sqns), 3-pdr Grenz brigade battery (8 guns)
    - Brigade: General-Major Joseph Radetzky von Radetz
      - Gradiscaner Grenz IR # 8 (2 bns), Archduke Charles Uhlans Regt # 3 (8 sqns), 6-pdr cavalry battery (6 guns)

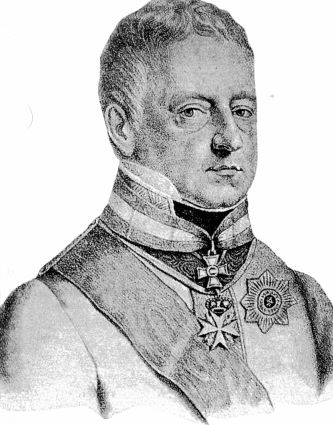
Michael Kienmayer

- II Reserve Armeekorps: Feldmarschall-Leutnant Michael von Kienmayer. Order of battle.
  - Brigade: General-Major Konstantin Ghilian Karl d'Aspré
    - Puteani, Brezeczinsky, Scovaud, Kirchenbetter, Scharlach Grenadier bns, 6-pdr brigade battery (8 guns)
  - Brigade: General-Major Josef von Clary
    - Levenehr Dragoon Regt # 4 (6 sqns), Württemberg Dragoon Regt # 3 (6 sqns), 6-pdr cavalry battery (6 guns)
  - Brigade: General-Major Andreas Schneller (Detached to I Reserve Armeekorps)

=== Key ===
- IR = Infantry Regiment
- bn, bns = Infantry battalion(s)
- sqn, sqns = Cavalry squadron(s)
- bty, btys = Artillery battery (batteries)
- Regt = Regiment
- 3-pdr, 6-pdr, 12-pdr = 3 (light), 6 (medium) and 12 (heavy) pounder field guns.

=== French-Allied forces ===
Jean-Baptiste Bessières

Returns from 16 April 1809
Provisional Corps: Marshal Jean-Baptiste Bessières

- Cavalry Division, IV Corps: General of Brigade Jacob François Marulaz (2,765). Includes three staff members.
  - 1st Brigade: Commander unknown (1,193)
    - 19th Chasseurs à Cheval Regt (3 sqns), 23rd Chasseurs à Cheval Regt (3 sqns)
  - 2nd Brigade: General of Brigade Bertrand Pierre Castex (829)
    - 3rd Chasseurs à Cheval Regt (3 sqns), 14th Chasseurs à Cheval Regt (3 sqns)
  - 3rd Brigade: Commander unknown (740)
    - Baden Light Dragoon Regt (4 sqns), Hesse-Darmstadt Chevau-léger Regt (3 sqns)
- Cavalry Brigade, III Corps: General of Brigade Charles Claude Jacquinot (1,797)
  - 1st Chasseurs à Cheval Regt (3 sqns), 2nd Chasseurs à Cheval Regt (3 sqns), 12th Chasseurs à Cheval Regt (3 sqns)
- 2nd Bavarian Division, VII Corps: Lieutenant-General Karl Philipp von Wrede (8,944). Includes 250 headquarters guards.
  - Brigade: General-Major Minuzzi (3,980)
    - 6th Laroche Light bn, 3rd Prince Karl IR (2 bns), 13th IR (2 bns)
  - Brigade: General-Major Beckers (3,139)
    - 6th Duc Wilhelm IR (2 bns), 7th Löwenstein IR (2 bns)
  - Cavalry Brigade: General-Major Preysing (1,012)
    - König Chevau-léger Regt (4 sqns), Leiningen Chevau-léger Regt (4 sqns)
  - Artillery: Two 6-pdr foot btys, 6-pdr horse bty (563, 18 guns)

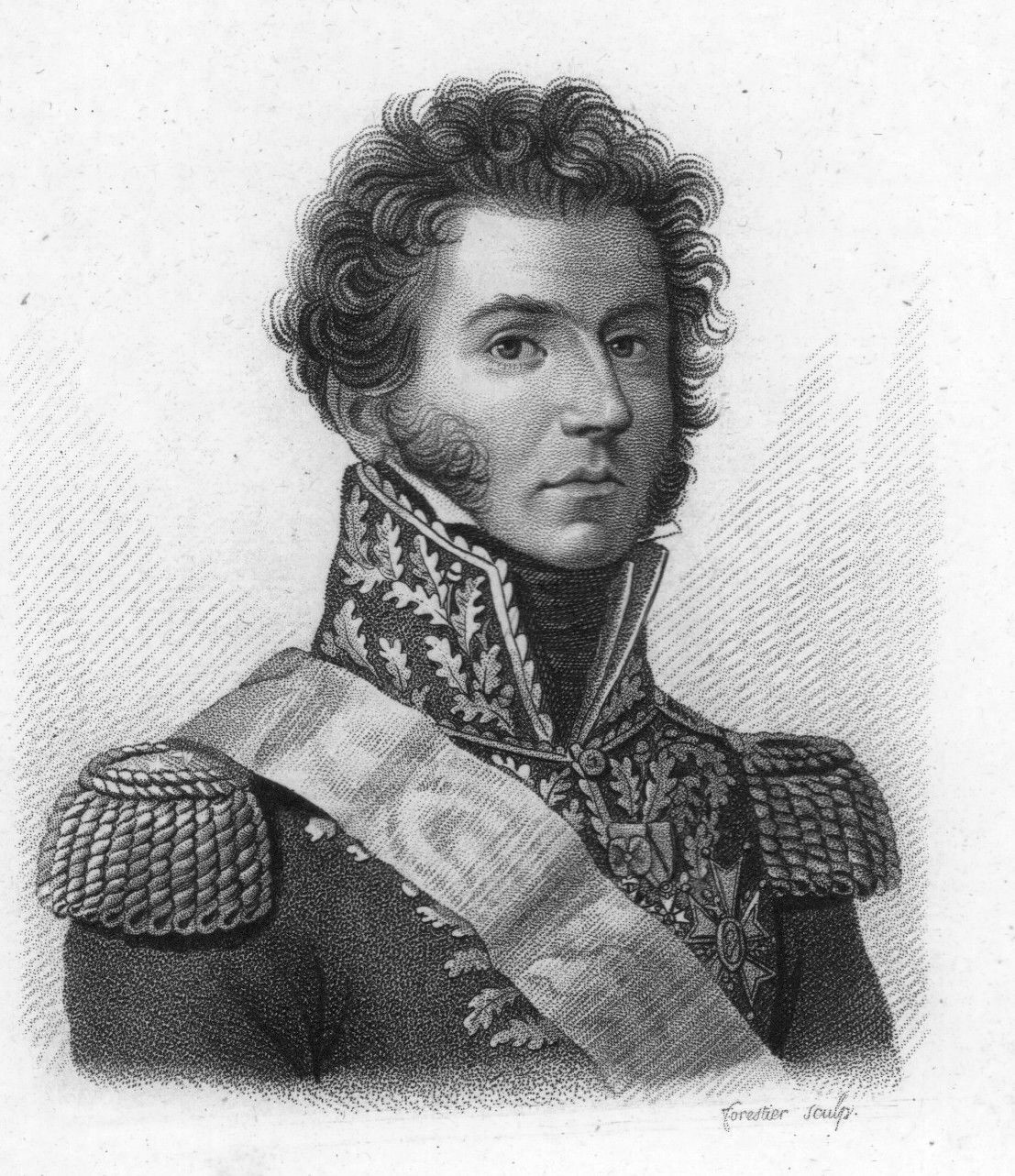
Gabriel Molitor

- 3rd Division, IV Corps: General of Division Gabriel Jean Joseph Molitor (7,155). Includes 16 staff members.
  - Brigade: General of Brigade François Joseph Leguay (3,647)
    - 2nd Line IR (2 bns), 16th Line IR (3 bns)
  - Brigade: General of Brigade Raymond Viviès de La Prade (3,184)
    - 37th Line IR (3 bns), 67th Line IR (2 bns)
  - Artillery: 6-pdr foot bty (308, 6 guns)

== Notes ==
Preceded by Battle of Ratisbon	Napoleonic Wars; Battle of Neumarkt-Sankt Veit	Succeeded by Dalmatian Campaign (1809)
