= Michael von Kienmayer =

Austrian general (1756–1828)

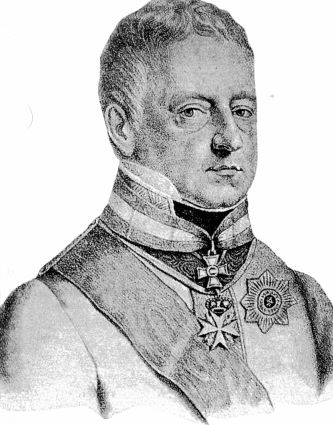
- Michael von Kienmayer
- Born: 17 January 1756; Vienna, Austria
- Died: 18 October 1828 (aged 72) Vienna, Austria
- Allegiance: Habsburg Monarchy
- Rank: General of Cavalry
- Conflicts: War of the Bavarian Succession; Austro-Turkish War (1788–1791); Battle of Focșani; Battle of Rymnik; French Revolutionary Wars; Flanders Campaign; Battle of Amberg; Battle of Würzburg; Battle of Ostrach; First Battle of Stockach; Battle of Biberach; Battle of Hohenlinden; Napoleonic Wars; Ulm Campaign; Battle of Austerlitz; Battle of Landshut; Battle of Ebersberg; Battle of Aspern-Essling; Battle of Gefrees
- Awards: 1789, Knight's Cross of the Military Order of Maria Theresa; 1810, Commander's Cross of the Military Order of Maria Theresa

Michael von Kienmayer (17 January 1756 – 28 October 1828) was an Austrian general. Kienmayer joined the army of the Habsburg monarchy and fought against the Kingdom of Prussia and Ottoman Turkey. During the French Revolutionary Wars, he continued to make his reputation in the cavalry and became a general officer. In the War of the Second Coalition and the Napoleonic Wars he commanded both divisions and corps. He was appointed Proprietor (Inhaber) of an Austrian cavalry regiment in 1802 and held this honor until his death. Later he was the governor of Galicia, Transylvania, and Moravia.

== Early career ==
Kienmayer began his military career in 1774 as a cadet in the imperial Austrian Puebla de Portugalo Infantry Regiment # 26. In 1775 he was promoted second lieutenant in the Jung-Modena Dragoon Regiment # 8. As a member of the Barco Hussar Regiment # 35, he participated in the War of the Bavarian Succession in 1778.

During the Austro-Turkish War, Kienmayer excelled in a skirmish against a force of Turks that attacked the Austrian outposts in April 1788. Later that year, he served under Prince Josias of Saxe-Coburg-Saalfeld in the siege of Khotyn Fortress and was promoted major in November. He fought in the Battle of Focșani on 21 July 1789 and received a promotion to Oberst-Leutnant in recognition of a successful raid carried out afterward. After the Battle of Rymnik in September, Coburg sent Kienmayer to carry the victory dispatch to Emperor Joseph II. He quickly returned to the front and executed another successful cavalry raid in November, capturing a senior Turkish officer. Promoted to Oberst (colonel), he assumed command of the Levenehr Dragoon Regiment # 19. He was also awarded the Military Order of Maria Theresa, Austria's highest honor for valor, on 21 December 1789 for bravery in the face of the enemy.

== French Revolutionary Wars ==
=== War of the First Coalition ===
Reassigned to the Barco Hussars, Kienmayer led the regiment in the Flanders Campaign in the War of the First Coalition beginning in April 1792. He fought under Franz Kaunitz-Rietberg in the Battle of Rouvroy on 13 May 1794. The Austrians turned back Louis Charbonnier's attempt to advance north of the Sambre River. During the action, Kienmayer led his hussars in a charge that rode down a column of 6,000 Frenchmen. He was promoted General-Major on 11 June for outstanding achievement.

At the beginning of summer campaign of 1796 in southern Germany, Kienmayer led a brigade in the Army of the Lower Rhine under first Archduke Charles and later Wilhelm von Wartensleben. Jean-Baptiste Jourdan's Army of Sambre-et-Meuse surprised his force of 4,500 soldiers at Giessen on 8 July. The French hustled his troops out of the town, but his losses were light. He fought in Pál Kray's division at Sulzbach-Rosenberg on 17 August. This action came shortly before the Battle of Amberg when Archduke Charles re-assumed command of the army. He led an infantry-cavalry brigade in Friedrich von Hotze's division at the Battle of Würzburg on 3 September. The following day he led a brilliant cavalry raid, capturing a large supply depot at Wertheim am Main and a small flotilla of munitions boats.

=== War of the Second Coalition ===
At the start of the War of the Second Coalition, Kienmayer fought at the Battle of Ostrach on 20–21 March 1799. Four days later, he led his cavalry brigade in Friedrich Nauendorf's division at the First Battle of Stockach. On 24 May, he defended Andelfingen, Switzerland, where he held off a much superior force under Michel Ney for many hours and escaped with his soldiers. For this exploit, he became a Feldmarschal-Leutnant on 6 March 1800. He fought in a clash at Bühl in April and at the Battle of Biberach on 9 May.

After the summer truce, Kienmayer was appointed to command the Right column of Archduke John's army. His 16,000-strong corps included the divisions of Archduke Ferdinand and Prince Karl Schwarzenberg. His column formed the northern wing of an attempted thrust at Jean Moreau's left flank. Events compelled Archduke John to convert the plan into a direct advance on Munich.

At the Battle of Hohenlinden on 3 December 1800, Kienmayer's corps formed the Austrian right flank. His troops drove in the French outposts and soon found themselves grappling with Paul Grenier's three divisions. His troops, particularly those led by Schwarzenberg, pushed forward aggressively. However, the leader of the Right-Center column, Ludwig Baillet de Latour, only gave weak support to Kienmayer's wing. Meanwhile, Moreau's generals pulled off an envelopment of Johann Kollowrat's Left-Center column. After Kollowrat's luckless corps was crushed, Moreau turned on the Austrian Right column, which still battled valiantly in the northern sector. Kienmayer gave orders to retreat, and he and his generals brought their troops off intact, though Archduke Ferdinand lost 500 prisoners. During the chaotic retreat after Hohenlinden, Antoine Richepanse mauled Kienmayer's rear guard at Frankenmarkt on 17 December, inflicting 2,650 casualties on the Austrians.

In 1802, he became proprietor of Kienmayer Hussar Regiment # 8 and held the position during his lifetime.

== Napoleonic Wars ==
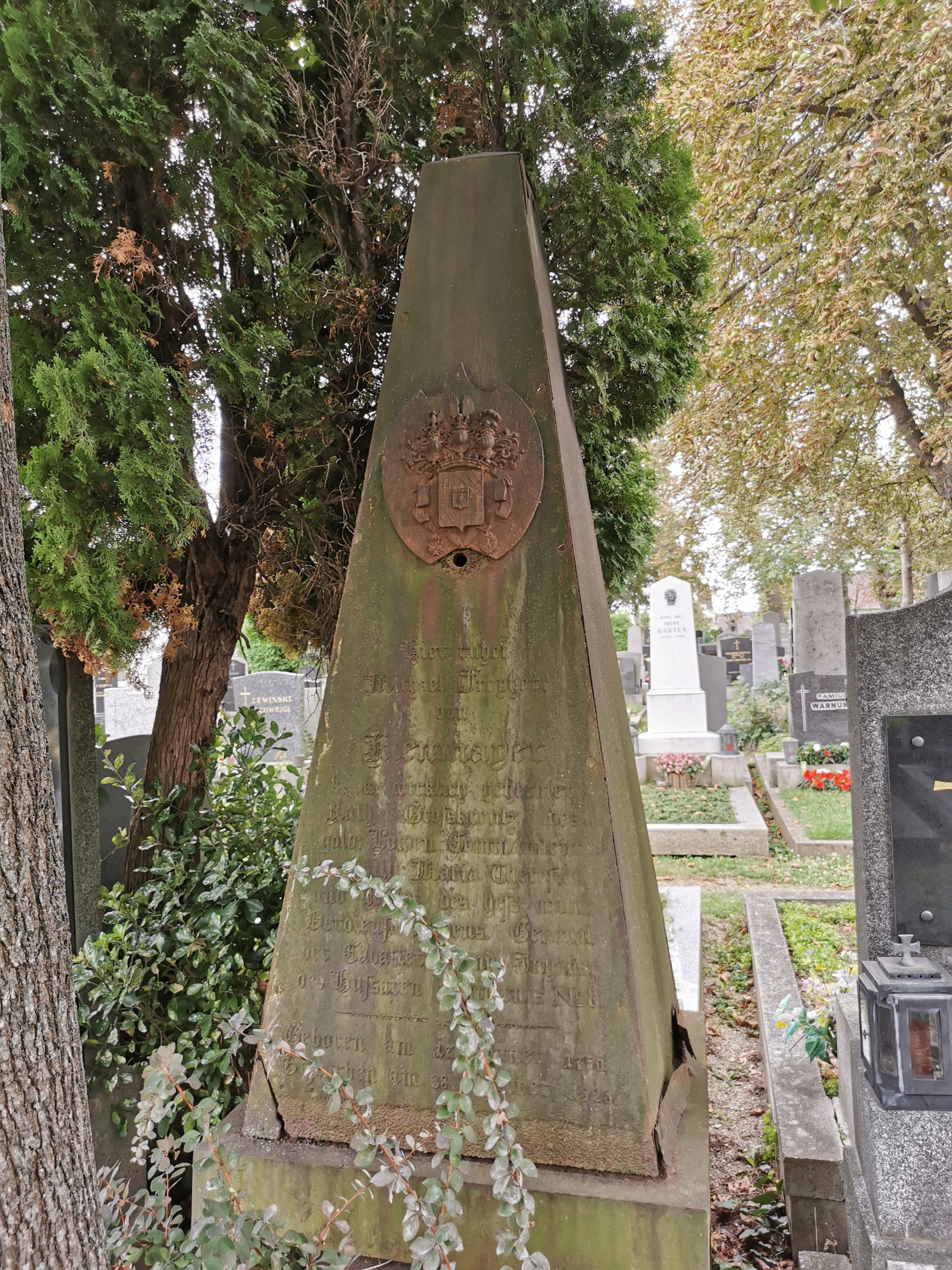
Kienmayer's tombstone (an iron obelisque) on the new parish cemetery in Penzing

=== War of the Third Coalition ===
In 1805, he served in the War of the Third Coalition as a corps commander in the army of Archduke Fredinand and Karl Mack. Since his force was deployed east of the main army, he successfully extricated his corps from Emperor Napoleon's attempt at encirclement and he avoided the fate of Mack's army in the Ulm Campaign. He soon joined Mikhail Kutuzov's Russian army in its retreat into Moravia.

At the Battle of Austerlitz, Kienmayer led the advance guard of Friedrich Buxhowden's Allied left wing. His 6,780-strong command formed the uniquely Austrian unit known as a light division, comprising both cavalry and light infantry elements. His brigade commanders were Georg Symon de Carneville (five Grenz infantry battalions), Moritz Liechtenstein (8 squadrons of hussars plus 1,000 Cossacks), Karl Wilhelm von Stutterheim (8 squadrons of light cavalry), and Johann Nostitz-Rieneck (6 squadrons of hussars plus 100 uhlans). There were 12 light cannon attached to the division.

The battle plan called for Kienmayer to clear Tellnitz village of French troops and grab the high ground to the west of the Goldbach stream. First, the Austrians encountered 300 French skirmishers on a vineyard-covered knoll at 8:00 am. Stout resistance forced Kienmayer to commit both battalions of the 2nd Szekler Grenz Infantry Regiment before the knoll fell. Utilizing the vineyards, ditches, and rough ground around Tellnitz, the 1,000 men of the 3rd Line Infantry Regiment fought all five Austrian infantry battalions to a standstill. At last, the Russian 7th Jägers charged in column and cleared the French from the village. By this time French reinforcements arrived on the scene and the 108th Line recaptured the village. However, the French carried their luck too far and a few squadrons of the numerous Austrian hussars charged. After losing several hundred casualties, including many prisoners, the French abandoned Tellnitz and retreated across the Goldbach. At 9:30 am, Buxhowden's Austro-Russians were finally able to deploy across the Goldbach. One historian writes,

Had they [the Allies] been able to rapidly dislodge the 3rd Line from Tellnitz, the story of Austerlitz would have been somewhat different. Instead, the gallant resistance of the French badly snarled the Allied advance, and made them vulnerable to the French counterattack on the Pratzen ... Certainly the Austrian tactics contributed to the French success at Tellnitz. While the spirit of the soldiers cannot be questioned, an examination of the casualties suffered in the attacks against Tellnitz satisfies this point, their piecemeal attacks can be justly criticized.

Later in the battle, Kienmayer stubbornly covered Buxhowden's withdrawal after the French breakthrough on the Pratzen Heights forced the Allies into a disorganized retreat.

=== War of the Fifth Coalition ===
Kienmayer led the II Reserve Corps in the War of the Fifth Coalition in 1809. This 9,000-man formation comprised five battalions of grenadiers and 12 squadrons each of cuirassiers and heavy dragoons. His troops fought under Johann von Hiller's orders at the Battle of Landshut on 21 April. During the retreat, he also led his corps at the Battle of Ebersberg on 3 May.

After rejoining the main army, Archduke Charles merged Kienmayer's command with the I Reserve Corps and reassigned him. He fought with distinction at the Battle of Aspern-Essling on 21–22 May, where he commanded 5,770 troopers and 24 artillery pieces of a reserve cavalry division. While the main armies battled on the Danube, light Austrian forces raided the French-allied Kingdom of Saxony, provoking King Jérôme Bonaparte to bring his Kingdom of Westphalia army into the field. In June, Archduke Charles appointed Kienmayer to form the XI Corps from the raiding forces plus reinforcements. The French tried to catch Kienmayer in a pincer, with Jérôme advancing from Leipzig and Jean-Andoche Junot moving from Frankfurt am Main. Kienmayer outmaneuvered them, defeating Junot at the Battle of Gefrees on 8 July. He then turned on Jérôme, who beat a hasty retreat, evacuating Saxony altogether. This notable success was negated by Napoleon's victory at the Battle of Wagram on 5–6 July.

For his victory, Kienmayer was elevated to the rank of General of Cavalry on 3 August 1809. Further recognition came in April 1810, when the emperor bestowed upon him the Commander's Cross of the Military Order of Maria Theresa. He served as deputy to the commander in Hungary from 1809 to 1813. He did not hold an active command in the campaigns of 1813 and 1814. Instead, he commanded the province of Galicia. From 1814 to 1820, he held military authority over Transylvania. He commanded Moravia from 1820 to 1826, when he retired from the army. He died in Vienna on 28 October 1828.

Military offices
Preceded by Friedrich Joseph, Count of Nauendorf	Proprietor (Inhaber) of Hussar Regiment # 8; 1802–1828	Succeeded by Ferdinand Georg of Saxe-Coburg-Gotha
