= Eggmühl =

Coordinates: 48.8438°N 12.1823°E

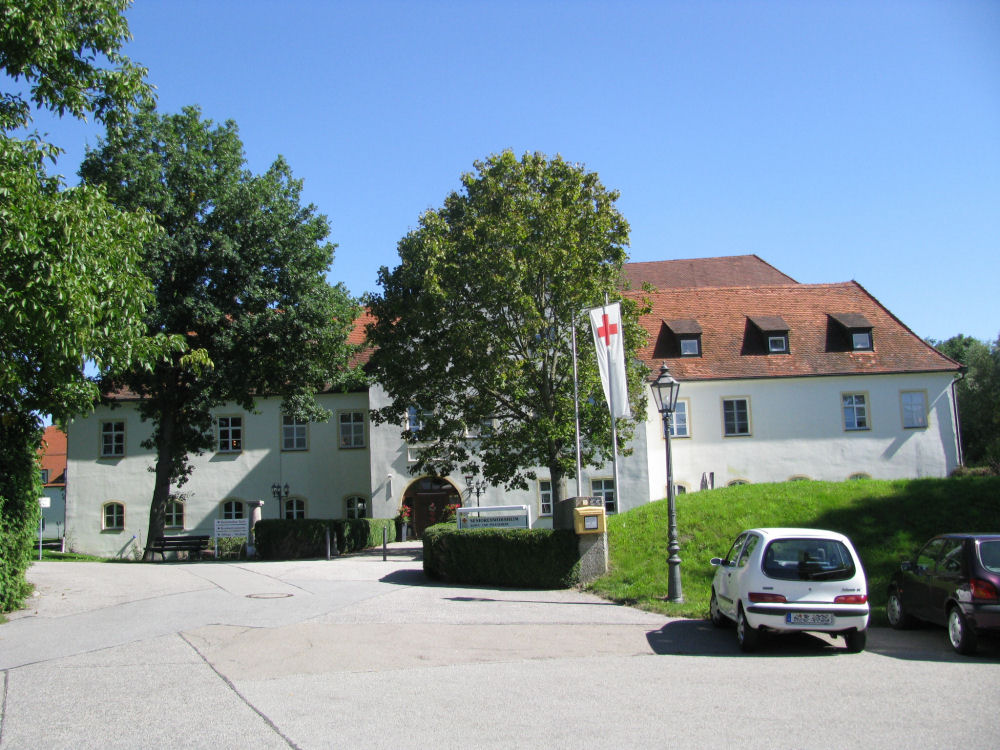
Eggmühl

Eggmühl (formerly known in English as Eggmuhl or Eckmühl) is a village of Germany, in Bavaria, on the Große Laaber, 20 km S.E. of Regensburg. Since 1978, it is part of the municipality Schierling. It is famous as the site of a battle fought on the 22 April 1809 during the War of the Fifth Coalition between the French, the Bavarians, the Württembergers under Napoleon, and the Austrians under the Archduke Charles, which resulted in the defeat of the latter. Napoleon, in recognition of Marshal Davout's great share in the victory, conferred on him the title of Prince of Eckmühl.

Coat of arms of Eggmühl

== See also ==
- Battle of Abensberg occurred April 20, 1809.
- Battle of Landshut occurred April 21, 1809.
- Battle of Eckmühl occurred 21–22 April 1809.
