= Johann von Hiller =

Austrian general

Johann Karl Freiherr von Hiller
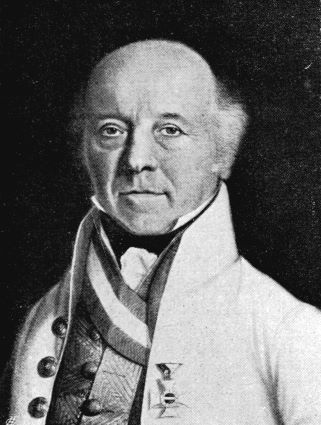
- Born: 13 October 1754; Brody, modern-day Ukraine
- Died: 5 June 1819 (aged 64) Lviv, modern-day Ukraine
- Allegiance: Austrian Empire
- Branch: Infantry
- Service years: 1770–1819
- Rank: Feldzeugmeister
- Conflicts: War of the Bavarian Succession; Austro-Turkish War (1787–91); French Revolutionary Wars; Napoleonic Wars; • Italian campaign of 1813–1814
- Awards: Military Order of Maria Theresa, KC (1788), CC (1809)
- Other work: Inhaber Infantry Regiment # 2 (1806–1814); Inhaber, Infantry Regiment # 52 (1814–1819)

Johann Baron von Hiller (13 October 1754 – 5 June 1819) was an Austrian general during the French Revolutionary Wars and the Napoleonic Wars. He held an important command during the 1809 campaign against France, playing a prominent role at the Battle of Aspern-Essling. Hiller also led the Italian front of 1813–1814, which was ultimately won by the Austrians.

== Early career ==
Von Hiller, born into a military family, served as a cadet in a Saxon regiment and as a lieutenant in the Wurttemberg Dragoons, then becoming a captain in a border regiment in 1774, a regiment he would eventually command.

Hiller fought in the Prussian theater during the War of the Bavarian Succession (1778–1779). Distinguishing himself in the Austro-Turkish War (1787–1792) for his vigor in defending his sector of Croatia, von Hiller was made lieutenant colonel in 1788 and was awarded the Knight’s Cross of the Order of Maria Theresa. During the siege of Berbir, von Hiller again distinguished himself and was promoted to Oberst or full colonel. He served as general aide to Feldmarschall Ernst Laudon, then returned to command his border regiment.

== French Revolutionary Wars ==
Promoted General-Major in 1794, von Hiller was assigned to the army in Italy, serving as Quartermaster General to the army in Lombardy. In 1796 von Hiller commanded a brigade in the Army of the Rhine, but ill health compelled him to retire. He returned in 1798, to participate in the campaign against the French in Switzerland. He was wounded in the First Battle of Zürich on 4 June 1799. Promoted Feldmarschal-Leutnant in 1800, he was then posted to the command of the Zagreb (Croatian) military district.

== Napoleonic Wars ==
He commanded the Tyrol district from 1801 to 1805. He retained command of this district, which did not see major action, during the War of the Third Coalition. Following the peace, von Hiller was made commander of Salzburg and Upper Austria.

When war with France broke out in 1809, von Hiller was given command of VI Armee Korps covering the left wing of the main Austrian army. When Emperor Napoleon I of France fell on the Austrian left wing on 20 April at the Battle of Abensberg, Hiller arrived and took command of the V, VI, and II Reserve Armeekorps. Defeated at Abensberg and on 21 April at the Battle of Landshut, he became separated from the main army. On 22 April Archduke Charles was beaten at the Battle of Eckmühl and retreated to the north bank of the Danube. Not realizing he was alone on the south bank, Hiller attacked Marshal of France Jean-Baptiste Bessières and won a minor victory in the Battle of Neumarkt-Sankt Veit on 24 April. Finally realizing the odds against him, he retreated in good order toward Linz from 25 April to 3 May. On the latter date he fought a savage action with André Masséna's corps at the Battle of Ebelsberg. This defeat forced von Hiller to withdraw across the Danube at Mautern.

In the Battle of Aspern-Essling, von Hiller commanded the extreme right of the Austrian line. His corps fought well during the desperate two days of fighting in the town of Aspern and contributed materially to the Austrian victory. He resigned his command shortly before the Battle of Wagram. In August 1809 Francis II of Austria appointed him Feldzeugmeister.

Following peace with France, von Hiller was made commanding general of Croatia and, in 1811, of Slavonia and Styria. In 1813 he commanded the Italian theater, opposing the army of Eugène de Beauharnais. While von Hiller was not defeated, his cautious operations failed to achieve a decisive victory, and he was replaced by Count Heinrich von Bellegarde.
