= Archduke Louis of Austria =

Austrian archduke (1784–1864)

Archduke Louis
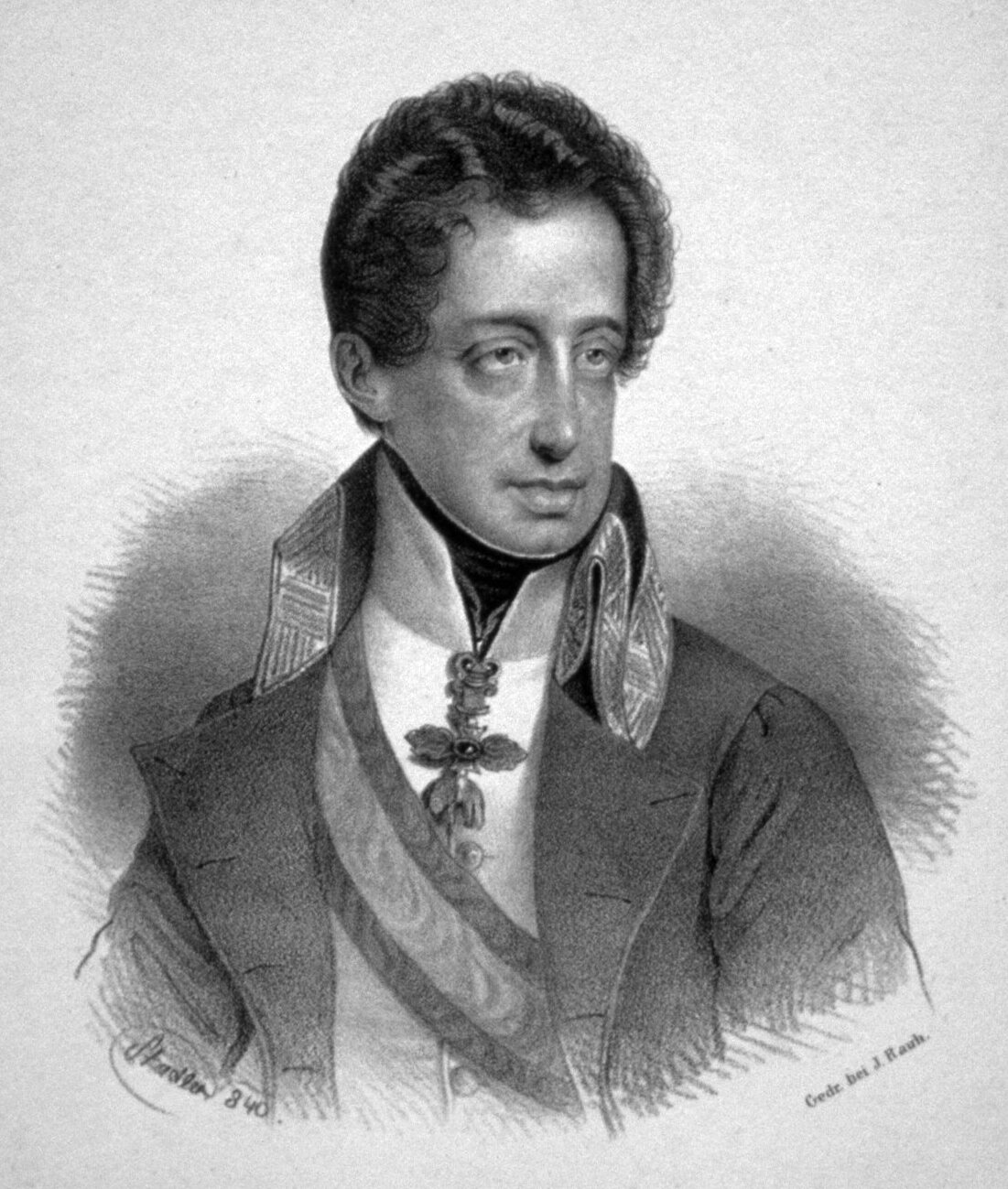
- Louis in 1840
- Born: 13 December 1784; Florence, Grand Duchy of Tuscany
- Died: 21 December 1864 (aged 80); Vienna, Austrian Empire
Names
- Louis Joseph Anton Johann
- House: Habsburg-Lorraine
- Father: Leopold II, Holy Roman Emperor
- Mother: Maria Luisa of Spain

Archduke Louis, Prince Royal of Hungary and Bohemia and Prince of Tuscany (Louis Joseph Anton Johann; 13 December 1784 – 21 December 1864), was the 15th child of Holy Roman Emperor Leopold II, King of Hungary and Bohemia, Grand Duke of Tuscany, and Infanta Maria Luisa of Spain.

== Biography ==
Archduke Louis was born in Florence, then the capital of the Grand Duchy of Tuscany. He entered the Austrian Imperial Army at an early age and soon gained the rank of Feldmarschal-Leutnant. From 1807 to 1809, he was general director of the Military Frontier. In 1809, he was appointed commander of V Armeekorps. In this capacity, he fought at the battles of Abensberg, Landshut, and Ebersberg in April and May, after which he relinquished his command.

He also demonstrated his political abilities by representing his brother, Emperor Francis II, on several occasions and was appointed in his brother's will to be head of the Secret State Conference (from 1836 to 1848), which controlled all government offices on behalf of Emperor Ferdinand I. The Archduke was in favour of Metternich's politics and supported absolutism.

He retired after the revolutions of 1848 in the Austrian Empire and lived quietly until his 1864 death in Vienna, the last surviving child of Leopold II.

== Ancestry ==
Ancestors of Archduke Louis of Austria

8. Leopold, Duke of Lorraine
4. Francis I, Holy Roman Emperor
9. Élisabeth Charlotte d'Orléans
2. Leopold II, Holy Roman Emperor
10. Charles VI, Holy Roman Emperor
5. Maria Theresa of Austria
11. Elisabeth Christine of Brunswick
1. Archduke Louis of Austria
12. Philip V of Spain
6. Charles III of Spain
13. Elisabeth of Parma
3. Maria Luisa of Spain
14. Augustus III of Poland
7. Maria Amalia of Saxony
15. Maria Josepha of Austria

== See also ==
- House of Habsburg
