= Battle of Landshut (1809) =

1809 battle of the War of the Fifth Coalition

- Part of the War of the Fifth Coalition
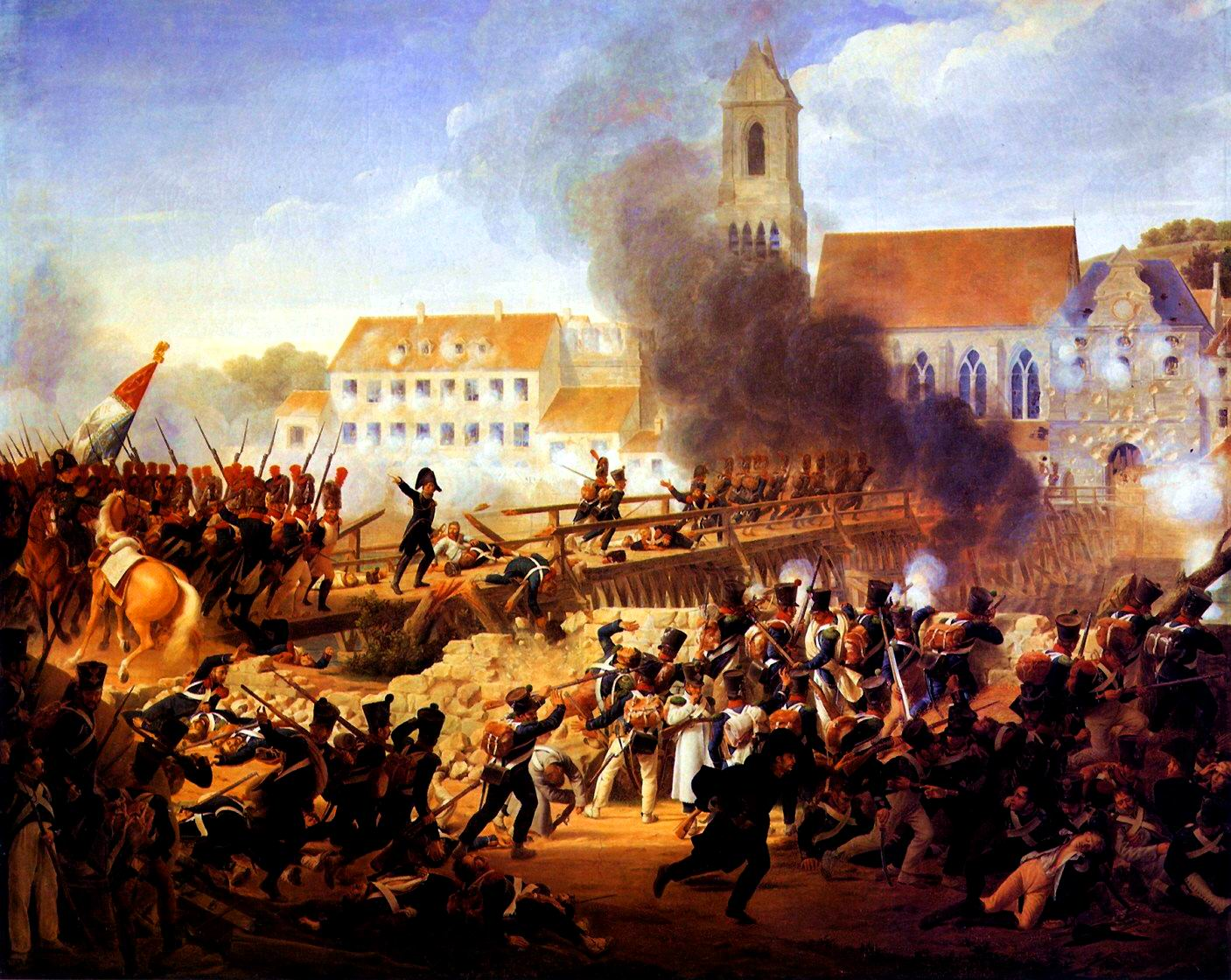
- General Mouton leads the grenadier companies of the 17th line regiment across the bridge at Landshut.
Date	21 April 1809
Location	Landshut, Bavaria 48°32′23″N 12°09′03″E
Result	French victory

Belligerents
France; Bavaria; Württemberg	Austria

Commanders and leaders
Napoleon I; Jean Lannes; André Masséna	Johann von Hiller

Units involved
Lannes Corps; 2nd Division; Württemberg Division	6th Corps

Strength
57,000–60,000	36,000–42,000

Casualties and losses
Less than 1,000 killed or wounded	8,000, including retreat; • 650 killed; • 2,150 wounded; • 2,400 captured; 38 cannon, 500 wagons, 1 pontoon
- Location within Europe

War of the Fifth Coalition
current battle
Napoleon in command
Napoleon not in command

The Battle of Landshut took place on 21 April 1809 between the French, Württembergers (VIII Corps) and Bavarians (VII Corps) under Napoleon which numbered about 60,000 strong, and 40,000 Austrians under the General Johann von Hiller. The Austrians, though outnumbered, fought hard until Napoleon arrived, when the battle subsequently became a clear French victory. This battle was preceded by the first battle of Landshut (16 April 1809) between Archduke Louis's vanguard under Joseph Radetzky and Bernhard Deroy's Bavarian III Division, in which the Austrians forced the Bavarians to retreat, with little loss on both sides.

== Prelude ==
There were two engagements at Landshut. The first occurred on 16 April when the van under Radetzky (from Louis' V Corps) pushed a defending Bavarian division out of the town and the river defensive position by outflanking it, – with the help of Louis' large-calibre artillery and having a reserve in the form of Louis' entire corps as support. Five days later, after the French victory at Abensberg, the left wing of the Austrian army (36,000 men) withdrew on Landshut (this force was once more led by Hiller). Napoleon believed that this was the main Austrian army and ordered Lannes to pursue the enemy. Lannes' troops caught up with Hiller on the twenty-first. Hiller had decided to defend Landshut to allow his baggage train to withdraw. At Landshut the Isar river was spanned by two bridges with a small island in the center. Hiller had positioned cavalry outposts to the north of the town. His main force was deployed in Landshut and to the south on higher ground. Early in the morning Hiller was informed that a French force (57,000 men) had crossed the Isar upstream at Moosburg. Masséna led this force.

== The battle ==
Hiller realized that he would be unable to hold his position for long, as Masséna was trying to block him from escaping. At this point his cavalry were forced back by Lannes's troops and the Austrians were pushed back into Landshut. The French now quickly seized the northern bridge over the river, and the Austrians withdrew into the main part of the town to defend the southern bridge. The Austrians tried to set fire to this second bridge, but owing to the rainfall over the previous days, this was only partially successful. However the Austrians did manage to close the gates at the end of the bridge. The French were now faced with attacking across the smoldering bridge. Napoleon ordered his aide General Georges Mouton (later comte de Lobau) to assume command of the attacking grenadiers of the 17th Line. In the face of heavy Austrian fire from all sides, Mouton ordered his men to attack without firing their muskets. The grenadiers reached the gateway and broke it down, allowing Bavarian troops to quickly reinforce the breach.

The fighting now continued in the streets of Landshut itself. However the French had crossed a bridge immediately to the west of the town and were now entering Landshut from the south.

== Consequences ==
Many of the defenders were captured, but Hiller was able to retreat with the bulk of his force toward Neumarkt am Wallersee. Landshut finally fell to the French just after noon. The Austrian force had suffered around 10,000 casualties as well as losing 30 cannons, but more importantly they had lost many caissons, a pontoon train, and thousands of supply wagons. The victorious French forces spent much of the afternoon ransacking these supplies.

The other part of the Austrian army was attacked at the Battle of Eckmühl.

== Notes ==
Preceded by Battle of Abensberg	Napoleonic Wars; Battle of Landshut (1809)	Succeeded by Battle of Eckmühl
