= Battle of Eckmühl =

1809 battle of the War of the Fifth Coalition

- Part of the War of the Fifth Coalition
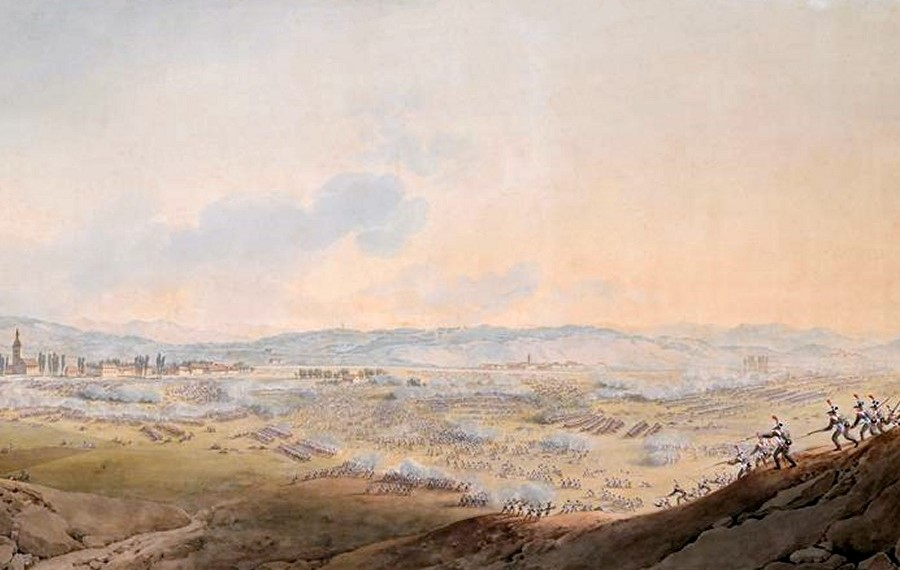
- Battle of Eckmühl by Bagetti Giuseppe Pietro
Date	21–22 April 1809
Location	Eggmühl, Bavaria 48.8438°N 12.1823°E
Result	French victory

Belligerents
France (Kingdom of Bavaria) Bavaria; Württemberg	Austria

Commanders and leaders
Napoleon I; Louis-Nicolas Davout (Note: Supreme commander for the battle on the 21st at Schierling.); (France) Jean Lannes; François Lefebvre; (France) Dominique Vandamme	(Austrian Empire) Archduke Charles; (Austrian Empire) Johann Kollowrat; (Austrian Empire) Johann I Joseph, Prince of Liechtenstein

Strength
Schierling: 18,000 (Note: Engaged only ("In den Kampf kamen...")); Eckmühl: 70,000	Schierling: 16,000 (Note: Engaged only ("In den Kampf kamen...")); Eckmühl: <46, 832 (Note: 75,000: Archduke Charles: <46,832; Johann Kollowrat: 28,168 (unengaged); Liechtenstein was unengaged as well.)

Casualties and losses
Schierling: 2,000 dead or wounded; Eckmühl: 3,000 dead or wounded	Schierling: 3,000; • 450 dead; • 2,550 wounded; Eckmühl: 11,000; • 6,000 dead or wounded; • 5,000 captured
- Location within Europe

War of the Fifth Coalition
current battle
Napoleon in command
Napoleon not in command

The Battle of Eckmühl (Note: a.k.a. Battle of Eggmühl) fought on 21–22 April 1809, was the turning point of the 1809 Campaign, also known as the War of the Fifth Coalition. Napoleon I had been unprepared for the start of hostilities on 10 April 1809, by the Austrians under Archduke Charles of Austria, and for the first time since assuming the French Imperial Crown had been forced to give up the strategic initiative to an opponent. Thanks to the dogged defense waged by the III Corps, commanded by Marshal Davout, and the Bavarian VII Corps, commanded by Marshal Lefebvre, Napoleon was able to defeat the principal Austrian army and wrest the strategic initiative for the remainder of the war.

== Strategic situation ==
Operating over a fifty-mile front (80 km), from Regensburg (Ratisbon to the French) to Pfaffenhofen, marked by stretches of rugged, wooded terrain, neither the French nor the Austrians had developed adequate intelligence about their opponent's strength, dispositions, or intentions. Assuming that the bulk of the Austrian army was deployed to cover their bridgehead at Landshut and the main highway to Vienna, on 20 April 1809, Napoleon launched most of his army in an attack to the southwest. The resulting Battle of Abensberg was a clear French victory, following which Napoleon ordered all but Davout's III Corps and Lefebvre's (Bavarian) VII Corps to pursue and destroy what he thought was the remains of the Austrian Army.

The French attack, however, had only split the Austrian Army, separating its Left Wing, composed of the V Armee Korps, VI A.K., and II Reserve A.K., from the balance of the army. Two corps, III A.K. and IV A.K., were withdrawn by Archduke Charles to the North, forming a nine-mile line (14 km) from Abbach on the Danube to Eckmühl on the Grosse Laber. More importantly, unbeknownst to Napoleon, the Austrians gained a victory of their own on 20 April 1809, by surrounding and capturing the French garrison at Regensburg and its strategic bridge over the Danube. The capture of the bridge at Regensburg allowed Charles to re-establish contact with his Right Wing, General der Kavallerie Bellegarde's I A.K. and FZM Kollowrat's II A.K., hitherto separated from the rest of the Austrian Army by the Danube.

== Plans ==
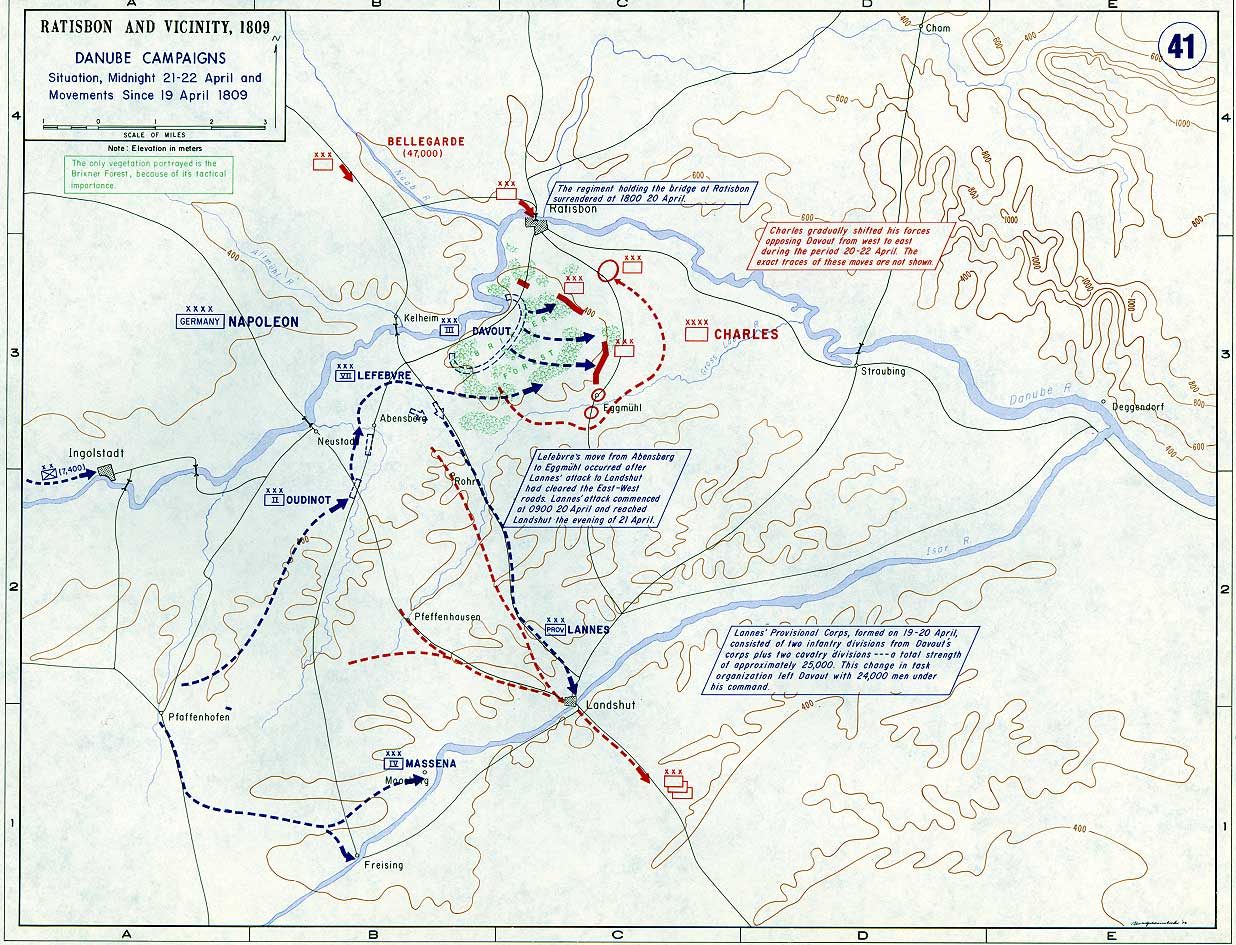
Location of forces as of Midnight, 21–22 April 1809

With the seizure of the bridge at Regensburg, Archduke Charles no longer needed to defend the Landshut bridgehead and instead moved to concentrate his remaining forces so as to envelop and destroy Davout's corps. FML Prince Friedrich of Hohenzollern-Hechingen's III A.K. (15,700 men) and FML Prince Franz Seraph of Rosenberg-Orsini's IV A.K. (21,460 men), were ordered to hold the Austrian left, pinning in place Davout's corps, while FZM Johann Kollowrat's fresh II A.K. (28,168 men) and the elite grenadiers and cuirassiers of G.d.K. Prince Johann of Liechtenstein's I Reserve A.K. advanced south from Regensburg and deployed against Davout's exposed left flank. Inexplicably, no orders were issued to G.d.K. Count Heinrich von Bellegarde, so his powerful I A.K. (27,653 men) remained on the north bank of the Danube and played no role in the subsequent fighting.

For his part, Napoleon was intent on enveloping and destroying the Austrian forces retiring Southwest to Landshut and its bridge across the Isar. The II and IV Corps (approx. 57,000 men under the overall command of Marshal Masséna) were directed to cross the Isar upstream from Landshut and block the Austrians from crossing to the South Bank. Meanwhile, under the overall command of Marshal Lannes, Lannes' Provisional Corps, the VII (Württemberg) Corps, a division from VII Corps and two cuirassier divisions (approx. 51,000 men) were to closely pursue and destroy the defeated Austrians. The mop-up of what Napoleon thought was a "curtain of three regiments" was left to Davout, even though more than half of the III Corps' original units had been detached to create Lannes' task force. Despite Davout's reports to the contrary, Napoleon ordered him to attack the Austrians on his front in the morning, with the proviso that Lefebvre's equally depleted corps would support him if he needed help (A total of approximately 36,000 men for both corps).

In all, Napoleon had 100,000 men for the campaign, while the Austrians had 75,000.

== Battle ==
On 21 April, a fierce meeting engagement ensued between Davout and Charles at Schierling near Eckmühl. Historian Bodart credits the French the victory in this clash. Castle's and Epstein's narratives describe this meeting as an ultimately indecisive, back-and-forth affair.

On the 22nd, the leading elements of the Austrian attack ran into Montbrun's determined cavalry, who managed to reduce the impetus of the charge thanks to hilly and wooded terrain. Rosenberg displayed serious concern when he realized that Davout's troops were not moving to account for the ongoing battle, and rightly assumed that more French troops were on the way. These troops had, in fact, arrived and brushed aside Rosenberg's flank guard. Napoleon had set the French army into motion around 2 a.m. on the 22nd and had his men march 18 miles (29 km) north in just a few short hours, meaning reinforcements for Davout would be arriving faster than promised.

The vanguard of the assault were the German troops under General Vandamme; these soldiers stormed the bridge at Eckmühl and even captured the town's chateau after ferocious Austrian resistance. At this point, Davout launched his men against the Austrian center at the village of Unterlaichling and the woods to the north. The famous 10th Legere Regiment became involved in vicious fighting around the woods, but eventually was strengthened by Bavarians under Deroy and managed to capture the positions. North of Unterlaichling, Davout's troops under Louis Friant and St. Hilaire steadily pushed back the defenders of Oberlaichling and the surrounding woods, overran a redoubt held by Hungarian grenadiers, and prompted Charles to order a general retreat; Charles thus decided not to use Kollowrat's and Liechtenstein's forces.

The struggle now devolved into a series of major cavalry clashes as the Austrians attempted to extricate their army without losing too many prisoners. Perhaps the best cavalry in the Habsburg army, the Vincent Chevau-légers and the Stipsic Hussars, occupied the Bettelberg ridgeline between Eckmühl and the woods above Unterlaichling. These elite units demolished some German light cavalry before being stopped by Bavarian infantry. Napoleon was insistent on the immediate capture of this position and ordered forward two heavy cavalry divisions under St. Sulpice and Nansouty. These horsemen were pummeled by Austrian artillery but came on nonetheless and managed to saber the gunners after having seen off the enemy cavalry.

The first phase of the retreat ended, but it was not over yet. The Austrians had found a chokepoint in the road and were instructed to stem the French tide. Three French cuirassier divisions supported by additional German light cavalry attacked and a swirling melee developed. The Austrians fought but were heavily outnumbered and had to retreat. During this part of the conflict, more French cavalry struck in their flank and the remaining Austrian horse fled north to Ratisbon with great celerity.

== Aftermath ==
The French had won the battle, but it was not a decisive engagement. Napoleon had hoped that he would be able to catch the Austrian army between Davout and the Danube, but he didn't know that Ratisbon had fallen and thus gave the Austrians a means of escape over the river.

Nevertheless, the French inflicted 10,700 casualties at the cost of just 3,000, and Napoleon's speedy arrival witnessed an entire axial realignment of his army (from a north–south axis to an east–west one) that permitted the defeat of the Austrians. Subsequent campaigning led to the French recapture of Ratisbon, Austrian eviction from Southern Germany, and the fall of Vienna.

Napoleon is alleged to have remarked of the series of manoeuvers that culminated at Eckmühl, it was "the finest" that he ever conducted.

Following the victory at Eckmühl, Napoleon's council of war led to the Battle of Ratisbon.

== See also ==
- Eckmühl
- Marshal Davout

== Explanatory notes ==
Preceded by Battle of Landshut (1809)	Napoleonic Wars; Battle of Eckmühl	Succeeded by Battle of Ratisbon
