= War of the Fifth Coalition =

1809 conflict during the Napoleonic Wars

- Part of the Napoleonic Wars and the Coalition Wars
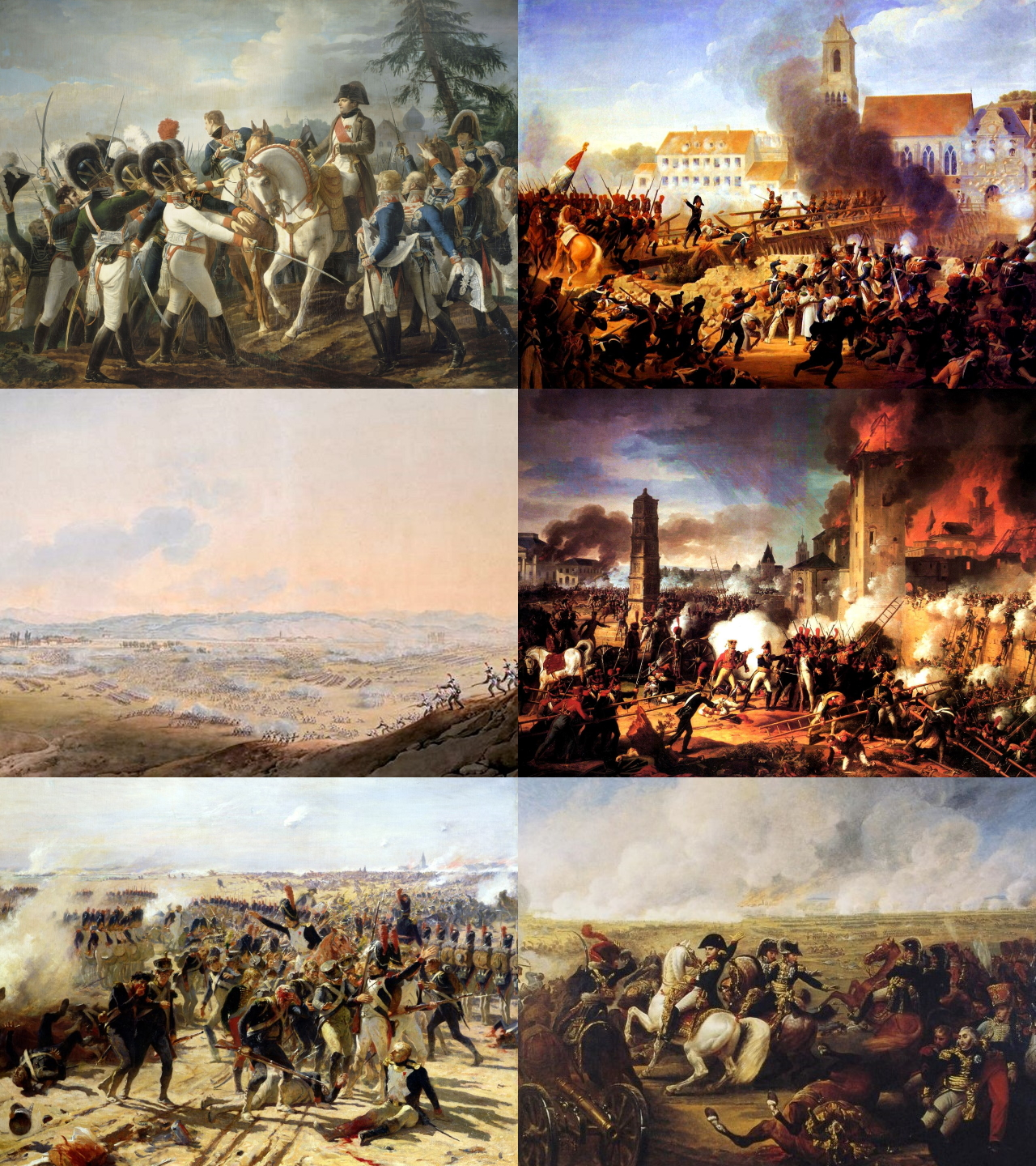
- War of the 5th coalition Click an image to load the battle. Left to right, top to bottom: Battles of Abensberg, Landshut, Eckmühl, Ratisbon, Aspern-Essling, Wagram
Date	10 April – 14 October 1809
Location	Central Europe; Northern Italy; Low Countries
Result	French victory
Territorial changes	Various Austrian territories were ceded: Illyrian Provinces to France; Salzburg to Bavaria; West Galicia to Duchy of Warsaw; Tarnopol to Russia

Belligerents
Fifth Coalition; (Austrian Empire) Austria; Minor participation; United Kingdom (Note: Mikaberidze 2020, p. 309 states that the contributions of coalition members aside from Austria were "rather nominal". Englund 2004, p. 345 writes that "the only real coalition to be mounted in this nominal fifth war of that name was the coalition France created against unhappy Austria; it included the key German States and Italy."); Portugal; Spain; Sardinia; (Kingdom of Sicily) Sicily; Rebel groups; Black Brunswickers (Note: in rebellion against the Confederation of the Rhine); (Tyrol (federal state)) Tyrol (Note: in rebellion against Bavaria); (Austrian Empire) Gottscheers (Note: in rebellion against France in Illyria); Italian rebels (Note: in rebellion against the Kingdom of Italy)	(First French Empire) France; Confederation of the Rhine; Bavaria; (Kingdom of Saxony) Saxony; (Kingdom of Westphalia) Westphalia; (Kingdom of Württemberg) Württemberg; Duchy of Warsaw; Italy; (Kingdom of Naples) Naples; (Netherlands) Holland; Russia (minor participation)

Commanders and leaders
(Austrian Empire) Francis I; (Austrian Empire) Archduke Charles; (Austrian Empire) Archduke John; (United Kingdom of Great Britain and Ireland) William Cavendish-Bentinck; (United Kingdom of Great Britain and Ireland) Spencer Perceval; Duke Frederick William; (Tyrol (federal state)) Andreas Hofer (executed); (Austrian Empire) Johann Erker (executed)	(First French Empire) Napoleon I; (Kingdom of Bavaria) Maximilian I; (Kingdom of Westphalia) Jérôme Napoleon I; (Kingdom of Saxony) (Duchy of Warsaw) Frederick Augustus I; (Duchy of Warsaw) Józef Poniatowski; (Kingdom of Italy (Napoleonic)) Eugène de Beauharnais; (Kingdom of Naples) Joachim I; Louis I; (Russian Empire) Alexander I

Strength
(Austrian Empire) 340,000; (United Kingdom of Great Britain and Ireland) 39,000	275,000; 40,000–50,000 Russians

Casualties and losses
170,000: 90,000 killed and wounded; 80,000 captured	140,000: 30,000 killed; 90,000 wounded; 20,000 captured

Napoleonic Wars
List of numbered map items:
1 Third Coalition: Germany 1803:...Austerlitz...
2 Fourth Coalition: Prussia 1806:...Jena...
3 Peninsular War: Portugal 1807...Torres Vedras...
4 Peninsular War: Spain 1808...Vitoria...
5 Fifth Coalition: Austria 1809:...Wagram...
6 French invasion of Russia 1812:...Moscow...
7 Sixth Coalition: Germany 1813:...Leipzig...
8 Sixth Coalition: France 1814:...Paris...
9 Hundred Days 1815:...Waterloo...

The War of the Fifth Coalition was a European conflict in 1809 that was part of the Napoleonic Wars and the Coalition Wars. The main conflict took place in Central Europe between the Austrian Empire of Francis I and Napoleon's French Empire. The French were supported by their client states—the Kingdom of Italy, the Confederation of the Rhine and the Duchy of Warsaw. Austria was supported by the Fifth Coalition which included the United Kingdom, Portugal, Spain, and the Kingdoms of Sardinia and Sicily, although the latter two took no part in the fighting. By the start of 1809 much of the French army was committed to the Peninsular War against Britain, Spain and Portugal. After France withdrew 108,000 soldiers from Germany, Austria attacked France to seek the recovery of territories lost in the 1803–1806 War of the Third Coalition. The Austrians hoped Prussia would support them, having recently been defeated by France, but Prussia chose to remain neutral.

Archduke Charles carried out major reforms to the Imperial Austrian Army, but the quality of it was diminished to some extent by the incompleteness of training and the Army's multinational nature. The French military relied on their talented emperor, veterans, whose numbers had dwindled over the course of recent wars, as well as the effective Napoleonic la maraude tactics. Napoleon, like the Austrians, had to cope with a multinational army, which included many foreign allies. On 10 April 1809, Austrian forces under Archduke Charles crossed the border of Bavaria, a French client state. The French response, under Louis-Alexandre Berthier, was disorganised but order was imposed with the arrival of Napoleon on 17 April. Napoleon led an advance to Landshut, hoping to cut off the Austrian line of retreat and sweep into their rear. Charles crossed the Danube at Regensburg, which allowed him to retreat eastwards, although he failed to reach the Austrian capital, Vienna, before the French. A French assault across the Danube was repulsed on 21–22 May at the Battle of Aspern-Essling but a repeat attack was successful in July. Napoleon won a close battle at the 5–6 July Battle of Wagram, but the Austrian’s stiff resistance throughout the campaign and withdrawal in good order frustrated France’s efforts to score a decisive victory. When the retreating Austrian army turned to face the French at the Battle of Znaim, negotiations mid-battle led to reaching an eponymous armistice on 12 July. Austria’s invasion of the Duchy of Warsaw was repulsed and they were driven out of their territories in Italy. They enjoyed more success in other theatres, seizing areas in Dalmatia and overrunning Saxony (where they fought alongside the Black Brunswickers), though news of the armistice reaching local commanders compelled them to halt their operations. British forces landed in Walcheren, in the French client state of Holland, but were unable to seize their objective of capturing Antwerp and later withdrew.

The war ended with the Treaty of Schönbrunn, which was regarded as harsh towards Austria as she lost her Mediterranean ports and 20% of her population. Despite the eventual French victory, their defeat at Aspern-Essling showed that Napoleon could be beaten on the battlefield. The war led to the Tyrolean Rebellion, the 1809 Gottscheer rebellion and rebellions in Italy which, although suppressed, foreshadowed future nationalist and anti-French risings. After Schönbrunn, Austria became a French ally, and this was cemented by the marriage of Napoleon to the Austrian princess Marie Louise.

== Background ==
In 1809, Europe was embroiled in warfare, pitting France against a series of coalitions in the Coalition Wars almost continuously since 1792. A brief period of peace followed the March 1802 Treaty of Amiens before Anglo-French relations deteriorated, leading to the War of the Third Coalition in May 1803. Britain was joined in their coalition by Sweden in 1804 and Russia and Austria in 1805. In August 1805, the 200,000-strong French Grande Armée invaded the German states, hoping to defeat Austria before Russian forces could intervene. The French emperor Napoleon successfully wheeled his army into the Austrian rear and defeated them at the Battle of Ulm, fought from 15 to 20 October. The Austrian capital, Vienna, was captured in November and a Russo-Austrian army was decisively defeated at the 2 December Battle of Austerlitz. The Treaty of Pressburg, signed soon afterwards, ended Austrian participation in the war.

Austerlitz incited a major shift in the European balance of power. Prussia felt threatened in the region and, alongside Russia, declared war against France in the 1806 War of the Fourth Coalition. After French victories at the Battle of Jena-Auerstadt on 14 October, France occupied the Prussian capital, Berlin. France invaded Poland in November, where Russian forces were stationed, and occupied Warsaw. Russian and French armies fought in February 1807 at the violent, indecisive Battle of Eylau. The action in Poland culminated on 14 June 1807 when the French defeated Russia at the Battle of Friedland. The resulting Treaty of Tilsit in July left France as the dominant power in Western Europe, with many client states including the Duchy of Warsaw. This weakened Prussia and allowed Russia to expand into Finland and South-Eastern Europe.

=== Peninsular War ===
In 1807, France tried to force Portugal to join the Continental System, a commercial embargo against Britain. When the Portuguese prince regent, John, refused to join, Napoleon sent General Junot to invade Portugal in 1807, resulting in the six year Peninsular War. The war weakened the French empire's military, particularly after Spanish forces and civilians rebelled against France after Napoleon overthrew the Spanish king. After the French defeat at the Battle of Bailén, Napoleon took command of the French forces, defeating the Spanish armies before returning to France. Jean-de-Dieu Soult drove the British out of Spain in the Battle of Corunna in January 1809.

In the beginning of 1809, the French client kingdom of Spain, ruled by Napoleon's brother Joseph Bonaparte, controlled much of Spain and northern Portugal. British and Portuguese forces under Arthur Wellesley launched new offensives from Spring 1809. Spanish regular armies including those led by General Joaquín Blake continued to fight and guerrilla activity in the countryside made French operations hazardous. A significant French presence, numbering 250,000 in June 1809, remained in the peninsula throughout the War of the Fifth Coalition.

The Napoleonic occupation of France's own ally Spain persuaded many in Austria that Napoleon could not be trusted and declaring war was the only way to prevent him from destroying the Habsburg monarchy. The Spanish guerrillas inspired popular resistance against Napoleon, and the Austrians hoped that French preoccupation in Spain would make it easier to defeat France.

=== Austria plans for war ===
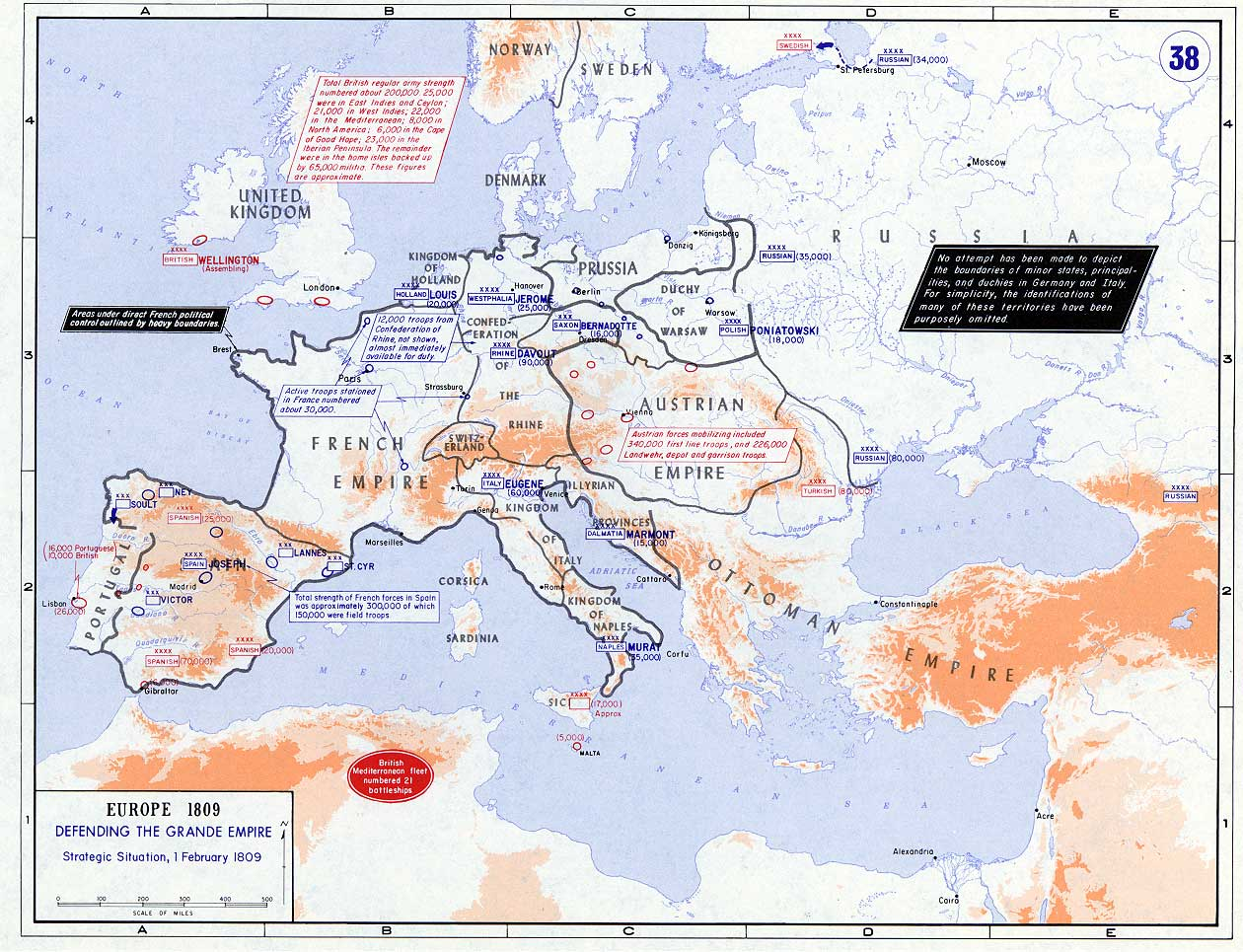
Strategic situation in Europe in February 1809

After Austria was defeated in 1805, the nation spent three years reforming its army. Encouraged by the events in Spain, Austria sought another confrontation with France to avenge their defeats and regain lost territory and power. Austria lacked allies in central Europe; Russia, its main ally in 1805, made peace with Napoleon at Tilsit and was engaged in wars with erstwhile allies like Britain in the Anglo-Russian War (1807–12), Sweden in the Finnish War and the Ottoman Empire in the Russo-Turkish War (1806–1812). France tried to reinforce their relationship with Russia through the September–October 1808 Congress of Erfurt. Under the treaty Russia agreed to support France if it was attacked by Austria. In early 1809, Austrian minister Johann Philipp Stadion secured Russian tsar Alexander I's agreement that the Russians would move slowly and "avoid every collision and every act of hostility" during any advance into Austria. At the same time, the French minister Charles Maurice de Talleyrand-Périgord secretly advised Alexander to resist France. During the War of the Fifth Coalition, Russia remained neutral even though they were allied to France.

Austria hoped Prussia would assist them in a war with France but a letter from Prussian minister Baron von Stein discussing the negotiations was intercepted by French agents and published in the Le Moniteur Universel on 8 September. Napoleon confiscated Stein's holdings in Westphalia and pressured King Frederick William III into dismissing him, and Stein fled into exile in Austria. On the same day that Stein was compromised the Convention of Paris agreed a timetable for the withdrawal of foreign troops from Prussia, where French garrisons had been in place since the end of the War of the Fourth Coalition. The withdrawal was contingent on the payment of heavy reparations, totalling 140 million francs, over 30 months. The Prussian Army was also limited in size to 42,000 men, one sixth of its pre-war total. The convention severely restricted the ability of the Prussian state to wage war. Despite this setback Stadion hoped Prussia would change their mind and that an Austrian advance into the French-controlled Confederation of the Rhine in Germany would lead to popular uprisings that would distract the French.

France withdrew 108,000 troops from Germany, more than half their strength there, to reinforce the French armies in Spain in October 1808. This lent support to Stadion's pro-war faction at the Austrian court. Stadion recalled Klemens von Metternich, his ambassador to Paris, to convince others to support his plan and by December 1808 Emperor Francis I was persuaded to support the war. Francis' support was tentative and the decision to proceed was made at an 8 February 1809 meeting that included the emperor, Archduke Charles and Stadion. The empire's poor financial situation (it could only afford to maintain its army on home soil until late spring) lent urgency to the decision. Charles disputed the prospects for success but accepted Francis' decision to prepare for war and the army was mobilised.

Austria and Prussia requested that Britain fund their military campaigns and requested a British military expedition to Germany. In April 1809 the British treasury supplied £20,000 in credit to Prussia, with additional funds promised if Prussia opened hostilities with France. Austria received £250,000 in silver, with a further £1 million promised for future expenses. Britain refused to land troops in Germany but promised an expedition to the low countries and to renew their campaign in Spain. After Prussia decided against war, the Fifth Coalition formally consisted of Austria, Britain, Portugal, Spain, Sicily and Sardinia, though Austria was the majority of the fighting effort.

=== Austrian army and strategy ===
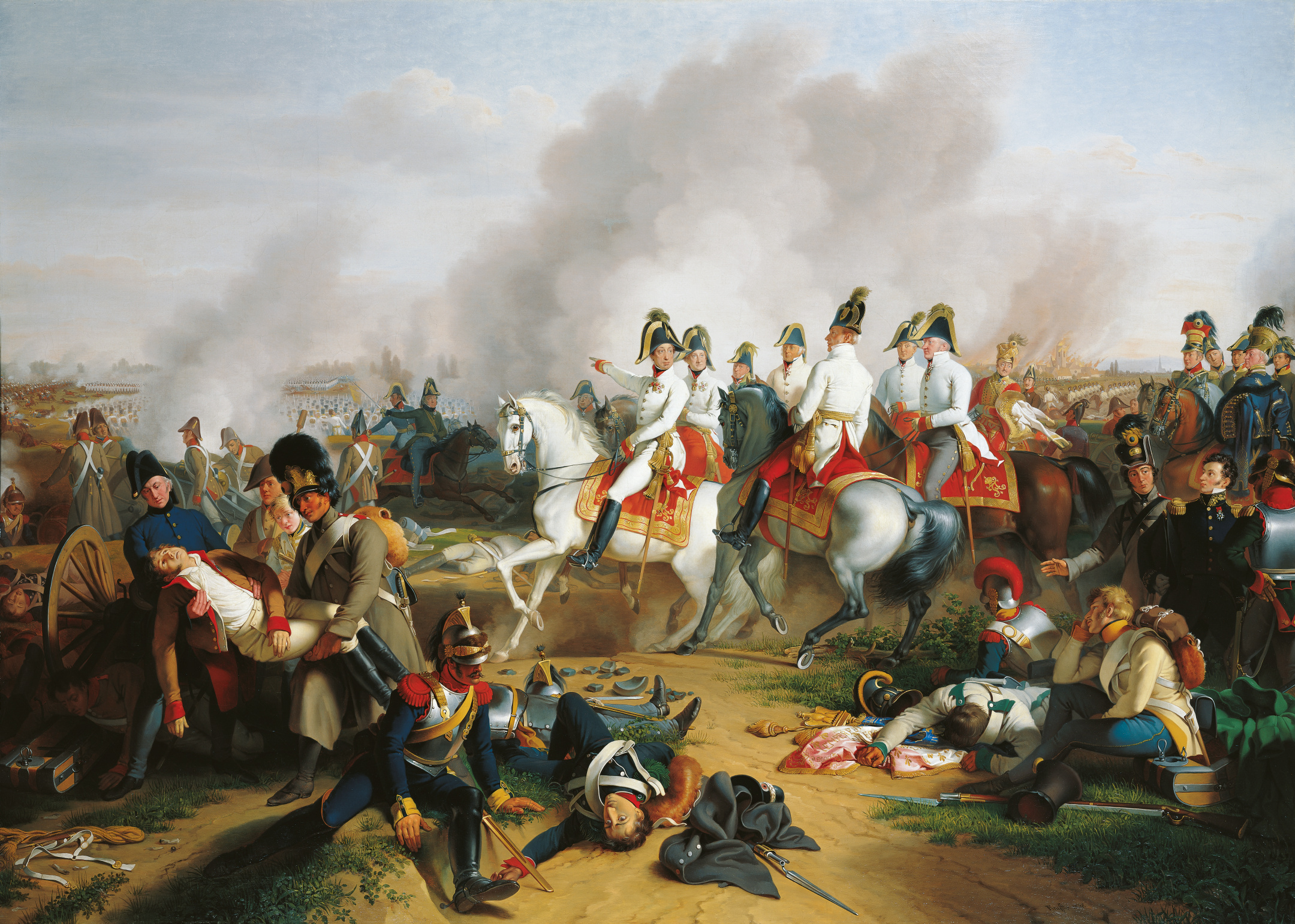
The Archduke Charles with his staff at the Battle of Aspern-Essling, 21–22 May 1809

Austria built the largest army in its nation's history, though its fighting quality was hampered by numerous factors. The men were conscripted from across the Austrian Empire and included Austrians, Hungarians, Czechs, Poles, Croats and Serbs; some, including the Hungarians, did not enthusiastically support their Austrian rulers. Conscription focused on the lower classes of society and the private soldiers, most of the non-commissioned officers, and many junior officers were illiterate. The army was well drilled in massed column formations which were effective against cavalry but vulnerable to artillery fire, which hampered it in some battles of the campaign. The regular infantry were thought too slow-witted to be trained in skirmishing; this role had traditionally been filled by grenzer light infantry units, but their quality declined since the potential conflicts with the Ottoman Empire ended. The deficiency was only partly remedied by recently created volunteer jäger units.

The Austrian militia, the Landwehr, were intended as a home defence force but were moved to serve with the field army. The force was equipped with second rate weapons, were poorly trained, and forbidden to accept officers from the landowning classes, leading to poor leadership. They were used later in the war as cannon fodder to divert French fire. The Austrian cavalry was of reasonably good quality, though in 1809 it was hampered by large numbers of its horses being only partly trained. The artillery was not as dynamic as in some contemporary armies, being placed under infantry commanders in the field and lacking proper horse artillery to manoeuvre quickly. The Austrian army was supposed to be supplied by a large wagon train, which restricted its manoeuvrability. Its senior officers were appointed based on aristocratic backgrounds and seniority, rather than ability; this led to elderly generals – the average being 63. The field commander, Archduke Charles, was unable to dismiss any of his commanders. He favoured doctrine over flexibility and expected his generals to follow a guide he had published in 1806.

Charles and the Aulic Council were divided on the best strategy for the coming war, Charles favoured an offensive launched from Bohemia where there was a concentration of Austrian forces and an attack could quickly isolate the French in northern Germany. The Aulic Council disagreed because the Danube river would split the forces of Charles and his brother Archduke Johann of Austria. They suggested that the main attack should be launched south of the Danube to maintain safer communications with Vienna. In the end the Council prevailed but the disagreement delayed the Austrian preparations by a month. The Austrian plan called for the I Corps under Heinrich Graf von Bellegarde, consisting of 38,000 troops, and the II Corps of 20,000 troops under Johann Kollowrat, to attack Regensburg (Ratisbon) from the Bohemian mountains by way of Cham. The Austrian center and reserve, comprising 66,000 men of Hohenzollern's III Corps, Rosenberg's IV Corps, and Lichtenstein's I Reserve Corps, would advance on the same objective through Schärding. The left wing, made up of the V Corps of Archduke Louis, Hiller's VI Corps, and Kienmayer's II Reserve Corps, a total of 61,000 men, would move toward Landshut and guard the army's flank. Two other theatres would be opened in Poland and Italy. Historian Steven Englund considers that Austria "might well have won the campaign" if the nation had focused on Germany.

=== French preparations ===
The French army mostly consisted of veterans of Napoleon's earlier campaigns, though recent conscripts formed large parts of some units, negatively affecting their fighting ability. The army was enthusiastic and keen to fight well under Napoleon's direct leadership. Napoleon was not certain about Austrian planning and intentions. He returned to Paris from his campaigns in Spain in winter 1808–09 and instructed the main French field commander in southern Germany, Louis Alexandre Berthier, on planned deployments and concentrations for this likely new second front. His rough ideas about the possible upcoming campaign included the decision to make the Danube valley the main theatre of operations, as he had done in 1805, and to stop Austrian forces that might invade northern Italy by positioning some of his own forces under the command of Eugène de Beauharnais and Auguste Marmont. Faulty intelligence gave Napoleon the impression that the main Austrian attack would come north of the Danube. On 30 March, he wrote a letter to Berthier explaining his intention to mass 140,000 troops in the vicinity of Regensburg (Ratisbon), far to the north of where the Austrians were planning to make their attack. It was expected that this redeployment would take until mid-April to accomplish and Napoleon instructed Berthier that if the attack came before 15 April he was to fall back towards the Lech.

== Austria–Bavaria front ==
=== Austria strikes first ===
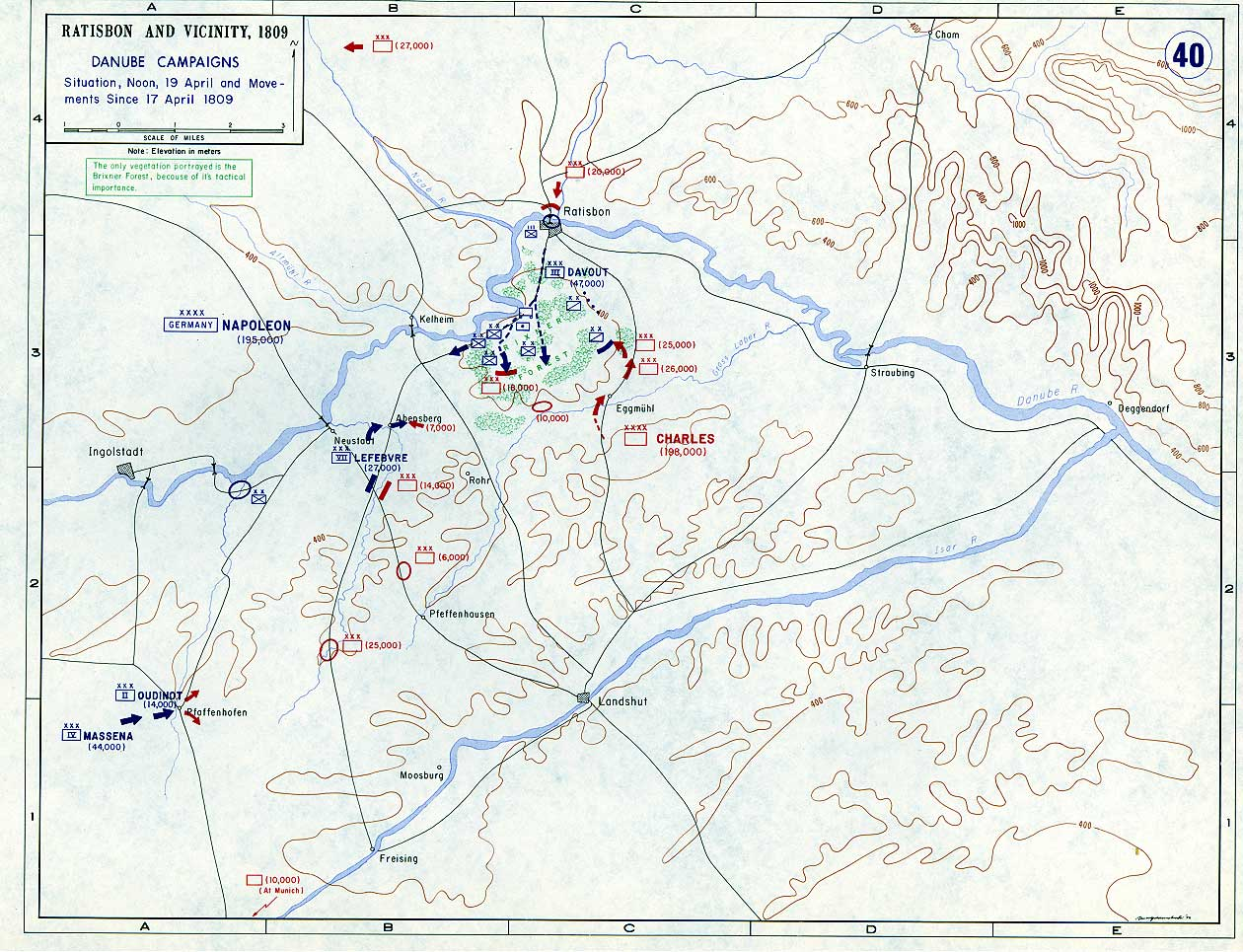
The general situation from 17 to 19 April involved the Austrians moving towards the strategic city of Regensburg in hopes of attacking the isolated French III Corps.

The first indication of an Austrian attack was a formal note sent by Archduke Charles to French Marshal François Joseph Lefebvre on 9 April. It stated that Charles had orders from Francis to invade Bavaria, a French client state under Maximilian I. In the early morning of 10 April, leading elements of the Austrian army crossed the Inn River into Bavaria; there was no formal declaration of war. Bad roads and freezing rain slowed the Austrian advance in the first week, but the opposing Bavarian forces of Lefebvre's corps gradually retreated. Davout's III Corps withdrew westerwards towards Ingolstadt, anticipating orders to concentrate with other French forces. The Austrian attack had occurred about a week before Napoleon anticipated, disrupting French plans. Napoleon ordered that an Austrian attack before 15 April should be met by a general French concentration around Donauwörth and Augsburg in the west, but his orders arrived fragmented and out of sequence and were poorly interpreted by Berthier who was more accustomed to staff duties than field command. Berthier focussed on an ambiguous sentence that called for Davout to station his III Corps around Regensburg "whatever happens"; it is likely that Napoleon intended this to apply only if the Austrians attacked after 15 April. On 14 April Berthier ordered Davout's corps, together with those of Lefebvre and Oudinot, to march to Regensburg which Davout had recently vacated.

The marching and countermarching left the Armée d'Allemagne with its two wings separated by 75 miles (121 km) and joined by a thin cordon of Bavarian troops. On the same day the Austrian advance guard had beaten the Bavarians near Landshut and secured a good crossing place over the Isar by evening. Charles planned to destroy Davout's and Lefebvre's isolated corps in a double-pincer manoeuvre. Napoleon arrived in Donauwörth on 17 April and took command from Berthier. When Napoleon realised that many of the Austrian forces had crossed the Isar and were marching towards the Danube, he insisted that the entire French army deploy behind the Ilm River in a bataillon carré in 48 hours. His orders were unrealistic because he underestimated the number of Austrian troops that were heading for Davout; Napoleon believed Charles only had a single corps over the Isar, but the Austrians had five corps moving towards Regensburg, totalling 80,000 men.

=== Landshut Maneuver ===
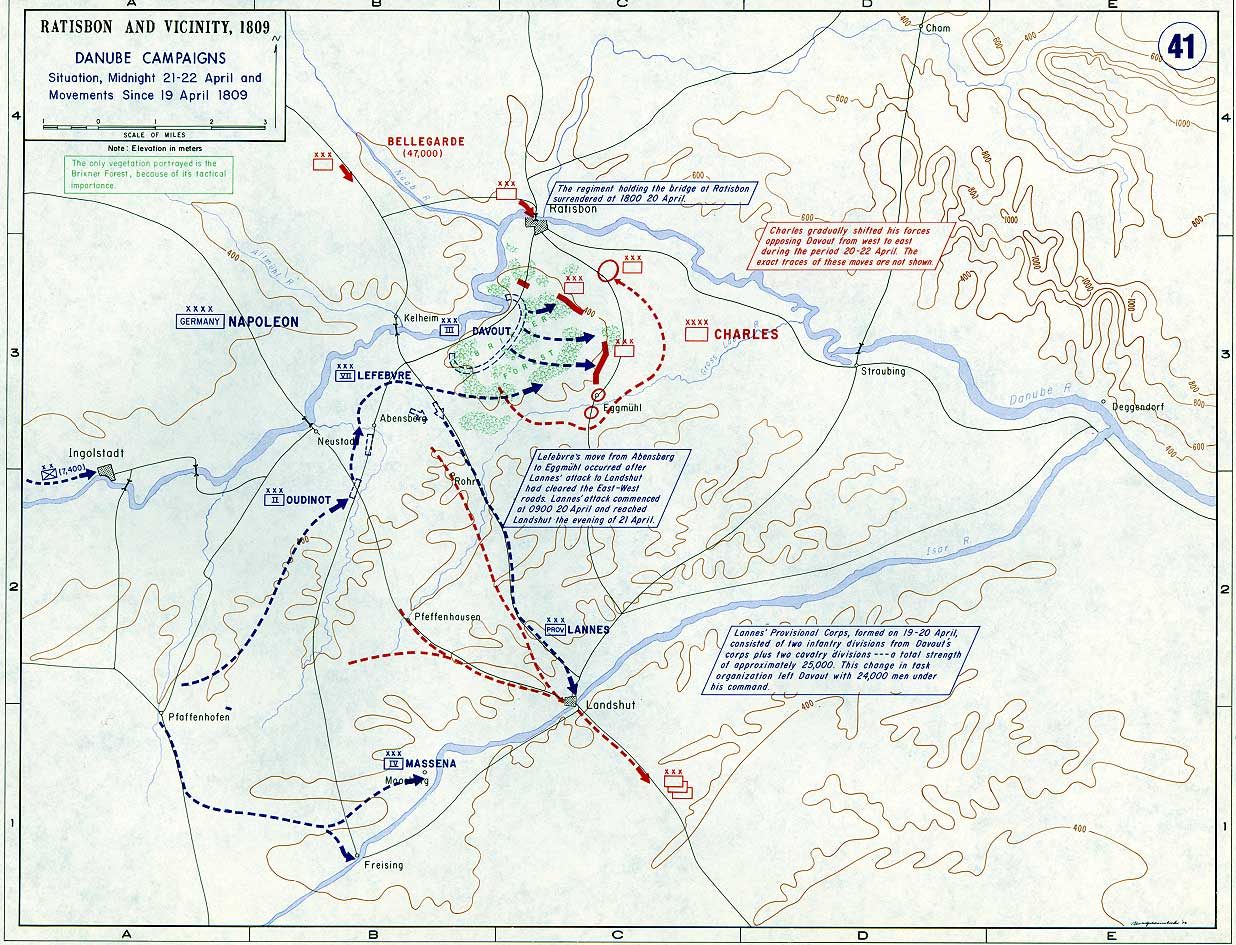
The Landshut Maneuver and the expulsion of Austrian forces from Bavaria

Davout anticipated facing overwhelming forces and withdrew most of his forces, leaving 2,000 men from Regensburg. The northbound Austrian columns in the Kelheim–Abbach zone encountered four columns of Davout's men heading west towards Neustadt in the early hours of 19 April. The Austrian attacks were slow, uncoordinated, and easily repulsed by the experienced French III Corps. Napoleon knew there was fighting in Davout's sector and devised a new strategy to defeat the Austrians: while the Austrians attacked to the north, André Masséna's corps, augmented by Oudinot's forces, would strike southeast towards Freising and Landshut in hopes of threatening the Austrian flank and relieving the pressure on Davout. Napoleon intended the corps of Davout and Lefebvre to pin the Austrians while his other forces swept into the Austrian rear.

The central Austrian V Corps were defeated in the Battle of Abensberg, allowing the French to advance. Napoleon was working under false assumptions that made his goals difficult to achieve. Masséna's advance to Landshut required too much time, permitting Hiller to escape south over the Isar. The Danube bridge, which provided easy access to Regensburg, and the east bank had not been demolished. This allowed Austrians to cross the river and stopped France from destroying the forces. On 20 April, the Austrians had suffered 10,000 casualties, lost 30 guns, 600 caissons, and 7,000 other vehicles, but were still a potent fighting force. With the main French army near Landshut, if Charles had attacked Davout he could have destroyed his corps and fallen on the rear of Napoleon's force. He retained the bridge at Regensburg and the road to Straubing and Vienna as an avenue of retreat.

On 21 April, Napoleon received a dispatch from Davout that spoke of the Battle of Teugen-Hausen. Davout held his ground; although Napoleon sent reinforcements, about 36,000 French troops had to fight 75,000 Austrians. When Napoleon learned that Charles was not withdrawing to the east, he realigned the Armée d'Allemagne's axis in an operation later called the Landshut Maneuver. All of the French forces, except 20,000 troops under Jean-Baptiste Bessières that were chasing Hiller, attacked Eckmühl to trap the Austrians and relieve their beleaguered comrades. On 22 April, Charles left 40,000 troops under Rosenberg and Hohenzollern to attack Davout and Lefebvre while detaching two corps under Kollowrat and Lichtenstein to march for Abbach and gain undisputed control of the river bank. Napoleon arrived at 1:30 pm while the battle continued. Davout ordered an attack along the entire line despite numerical inferiority; the 10th Light Infantry Regiment successfully stormed the village of Leuchling and captured the woods of Unter-Leuchling with heavy casualties. Recognising the threat posed by Napoleon's forces on his left flank, Charles ordered a withdrawal towards Regensburg, granting the field to France.

Napoleon sent Masséna to occupy Straubing as he thought the Austrians might retreat along that route. Charles moved his men across the Danube at Regensburg, leaving 6,000 in the fortress to block a pursuit. Lacking time for a siege, Napoleon ordered Marshal Jean Lannes to storm the walls, succeeding at his second attempt and capturing the town by 5:00 pm in the Battle of Ratisbon. With the Austrian army safely in Bohemia, Napoleon marched towards Vienna. Hiller fought a series of delaying actions, attempting to buy time for the defence of Vienna. After a short fight at Wels on 2 May, Hiller gathered 40,000 troops at the bridge in Ebersberg. Masséna launched a costly frontal at the Battle of Ebersberg and captured the position on 3 May, with Hiller withdrawing along the Danube. Charles attempted to move his army to defend Vienna but was outpaced by Napoleon who captured the city on 13 May. The garrison withdrew north of the Danube and destroyed the bridges behind them.

=== Aspern-Essling ===
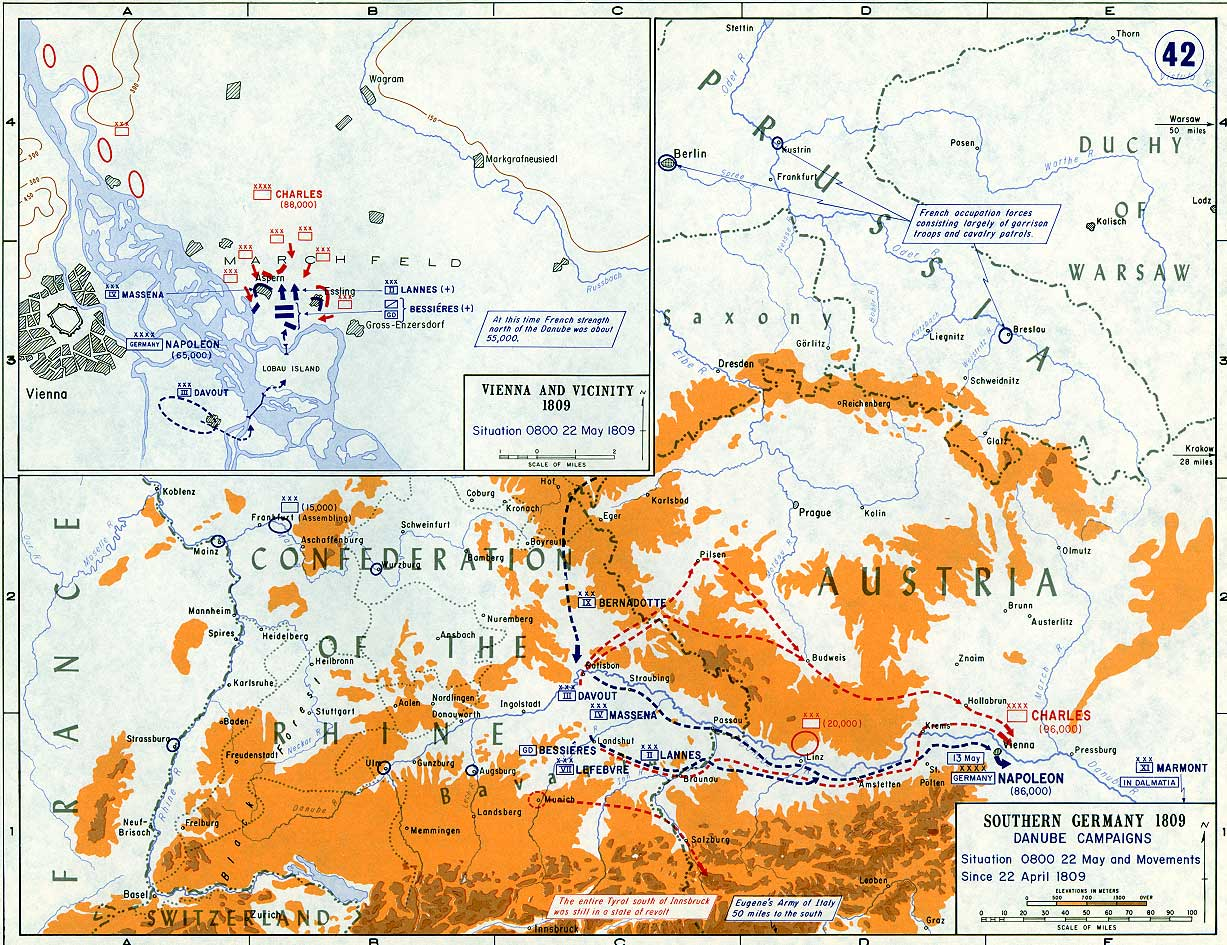
The strategic situation and the Battle of Aspern-Essling on 22 May 1809

On 16 and 17 May, the main Austrian army under Charles arrived in the Marchfeld, a plain northeast of Vienna just across the Danube that served as a training ground for Austrian military forces. Charles kept most of his forces several miles away from the riverbank, hoping to concentrate them at the point where Napoleon decided to cross. On the 20th, Charles learned from his observers on the Bissam hill that the French were building a bridge at Kaiserebersdorf, just southwest of the Lobau island, that led to the Marchfeld. On 21 May, Charles concluded that the French were crossing at Kaiserebersdorf and ordered a general advance for 98,000 troops and the accompanying 292 guns, organized into five columns. The French bridgehead rested on two villages: Aspern to the west and Essling to the east. Napoleon did not expect to encounter opposition, and the bridges linking the French troops at Aspern-Essling to Lobau were not protected with palisades, making them vulnerable to Austrian barges that had been set ablaze.

The Battle of Aspern-Essling started at 2:30 pm on 21 May. The initial attacks were made by the first three columns on Aspern and the Gemeinde Au woods but were poorly coordinated and failed. Later assaults succeeded in taking and holding the western portion of the village. The Austrians did not attack Essling until 6:00 pm because the fourth and fifth columns had longer marching routes. The French successfully repulsed the attacks against Essling throughout the day. Fighting commenced by 3 am on 22 May, and four hours later the French had captured Aspern again. Napoleon had 71,000 men and 152 guns on the other side of the river, but the French were still outnumbered. Napoleon launched a massive assault against the Austrian center designed to give enough time for the III Corps to cross and secure a victory. Lannes advanced with three infantry divisions and travelled for a mile before the Austrians, inspired by the personal presence of Charles who rallied the Zach Infantry Regiment, opened a heavy fire on the French that caused the latter to fall back. At 9:00 am, the French bridge broke again. Charles launched another massive assault an hour later and captured Aspern for the final time, but struggled to capture Essling. A few hours later, the Austrians returned and took all of Essling except the staunchly defended granary. Napoleon ordered the Imperial Guard under Jean Rapp, to support a withdrawal from the granary. Rapp disobeyed his orders and led a bayonet charge that drove the Austrians from Essling, for which he was later commended by Napoleon. Napoleon realised his bridgehead was untenable and ordered a withdrawal, giving command to Lannes. Lannes was struck by a cannonball and mortally wounded. The French withdrew to Lobau by nightfall, burning their pontoons bridge in behind them. Charles had inflicted the first major defeat in Napoleon's military career and caused the first fatality among his marshals, but his exhausted army could not pursue the French.

=== Wagram ===
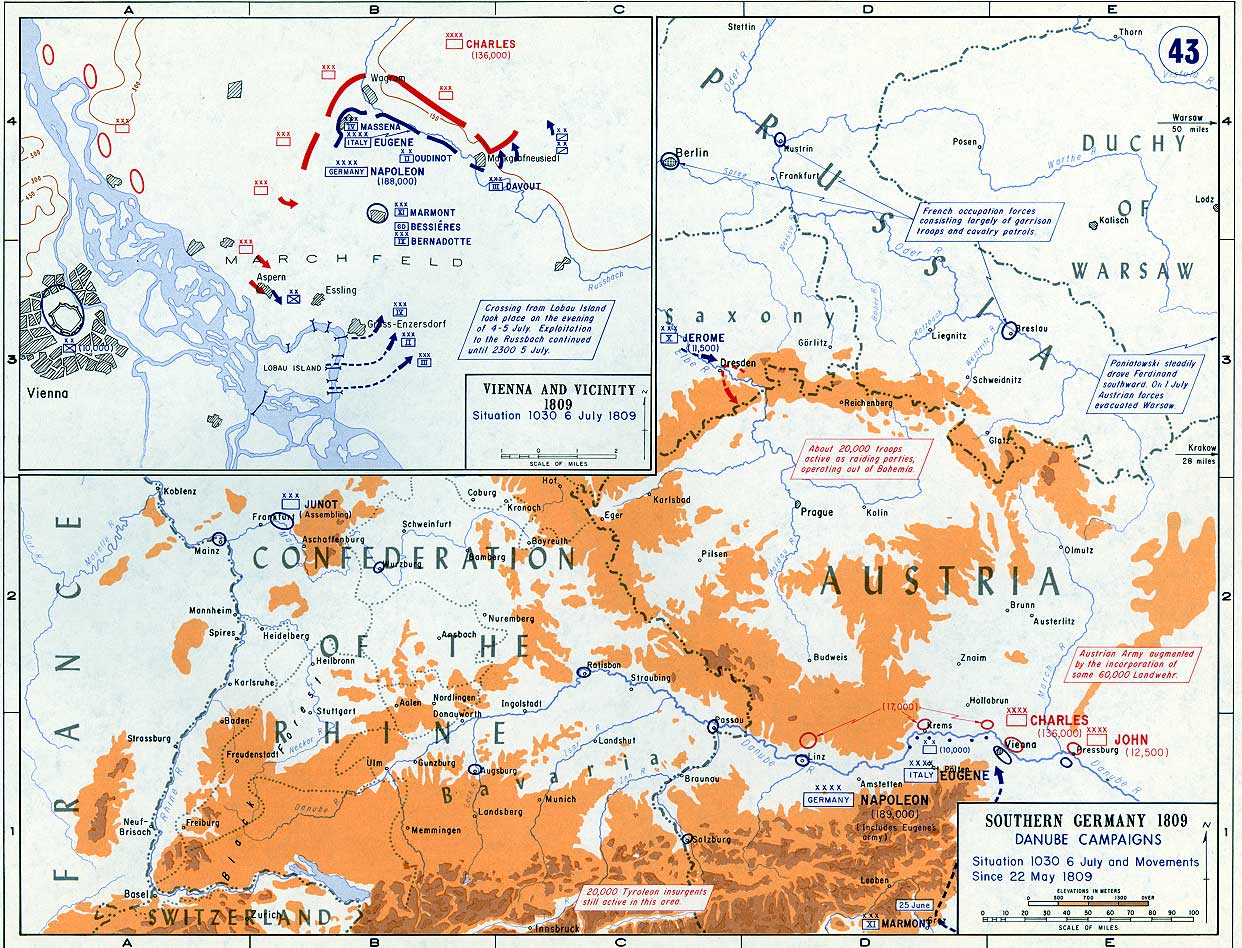
The strategic situation and the Battle of Wagram in early July 1809

After the defeat at Aspern-Essling, Napoleon took more than six weeks to plan and prepare contingencies before making another attempt at crossing the Danube. The French brought more troops, more guns, and instituted better defensive measures to ensure the success of the next crossing. From 30 June to the early days of July, the French recrossed the Danube, with more than 188,000 troops marching across the Marchfeld towards the Austrians. Immediate resistance to the French advance was restricted to the outpost divisions of Nordmann and Johann von Klenau; the main Habsburg army was stationed five miles (8 km) away, centered on the village of Wagram. The Austrian army had around 145,000 men. (Rothenberg 2004) Napoleon ordered a general advance at noon on 5 July; an early attack by Masséna on the left flank captured Leopold and Süssenbrunn but the French were held off elsewhere by a strong Austrian defence.

For 6 July, Charles planned a double-envelopment that required a quick march from the forces of his brother John, who was a few kilometers east of the battlefield. Napoleon's plan envisaged an envelopment of the Austrian left with Davout's III Corps while the rest of the army pinned the Austrian forces. Klenau's VI Corps, supported by Kollowrat's III Corps, started the battle on the second day at 4:00 am with a crushing assault against the French left, forcing the latter to abandon both Aspern and Essling. Meanwhile, Bernadotte had unilaterally ordered his troops out of the central village of Aderklaa, citing heavy artillery shelling, and compromised the French position. Napoleon was livid and sent two divisions of Masséna's corps supported by cavalry to regain the critical village. After difficult fighting in the first phase, Masséna sent in Molitor's reserve division, which slowly captured Aderklaa back for the French, only to lose it again following fierce Austrian bombardments and counterattacks. To delay the Austrian army for Davout's materializing assault, Napoleon sent 4,000 cuirassiers under Nansouty against the Austrian lines. To dissuade the Austrians from attacking, Napoleon formed a 112-gun grand battery in the center of his lines. As Davout's men were progressing against the Austrian left, Napoleon formed the three small divisions of MacDonald into a hollow, oblong shape that marched against the Austrian center. The lumbering phalanx was devastated by Austrian artillery but managed to break through the Austrian forces. With the Austrians at Wagram weakened by the need to reinforce their left against Davout, Oudinot was able to capture the village and split the Austrian army. Upon learning that his brother's forces would not arrive until the evening, Charles ordered a withdrawal at 2:30 pm. The Austrians withdrew in good order, the main army westwards and the left-wing to the north.

The French suffered heavy losses, around 32,000 men, with their commanders particularly affected as around 40 French generals were killed and wounded; Austrian losses stood at around 35,000. Fighting was renewed at Znaim on 10–11 July. On 12 July, Charles signed the Armistice of Znaim, which led to lengthy peace negotiations between Napoleon and Metternich.

== Other theatres ==
=== Italian front ===
In Italy, Archduke John battled Napoleon's stepson Eugène. The Austrians defended against several bungled French assaults at the Battle of Sacile in April, causing Eugène to fall back on Verona and the Adige river. Eugène was able to concentrate his forces while John detached troops to support Charles. John won victory at the 30 April Battle of Caldiero but was forced to retreat due to Eugène's increasing superiority and the movements on the Austria-Bavaria front. John was defeated in the 8 May Battle of Piave River and forced out of Italy. Eugène pursued John into Hungary where he heavily defeated him at the Battle of Raab. Eugène detached MacDonald to pursue John and joined Napoleon at Vienna with the rest of his army.

In the Dalmatian Campaign, Marmont, under the nominal command of Eugène, was fighting against an Austrian invasion led by General Stoichewich. Marmont launched a counteroffensive in the mountains on 30 April, but this was repulsed by the Grenzer troops. Further attacks in May led to a series of victories against a dispersed Austrian force. By the end of the month Marmont was able to march with the bulk of his troops to join the emperor at Vienna.

=== Walcheren Campaign ===
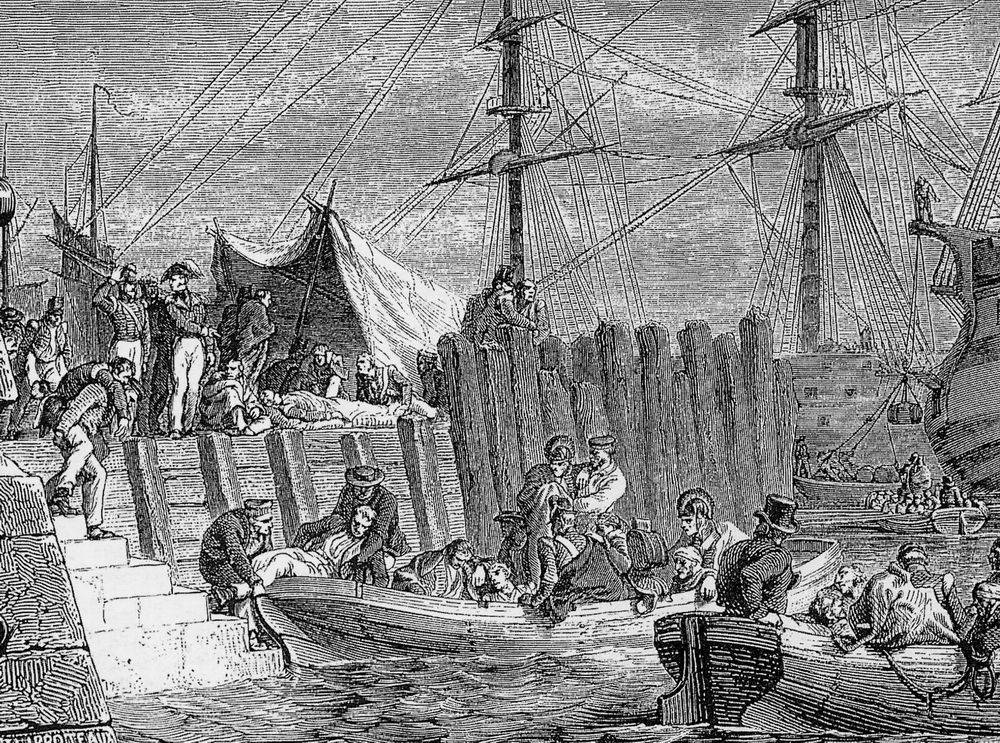
A depiction of the British evacuation from Walcheren

In July 1809, the British launched the Walcheren Campaign in the Netherlands to relieve the pressure on the Austrians and to weaken French naval power. The plan was to land a force at Walcheren and advance along the Western Scheldt to the harbour of Antwerp, a French naval base. The Royal Navy's patrols into the Western Scheldt and a dockyard strike at Antwerp alerted the French to the area's vulnerability and efforts were made to improve the defences and reinforce its garrisons. John Pitt, 2nd Earl of Chatham's force of over 39,000, a larger army than that serving in the Iberian Peninsula and the largest British Expeditionary Force of the Napoleonic Wars, landed at Walcheren on 30 July. The expedition was not capable of landing sufficient troops on the southern side of the Western Scheldt to capture the reinforced garrison at Cadzand due to a lack of boats. An advance on Antwerp depended on the capture of Flushing on the northern shore to allow the passage of Royal Navy vessels up the Western Scheldt.

It took until 13 August for siege batteries to be set up and Flushing did not surrender until 16 August. The British forces had meanwhile been suffering from "Walcheren Fever", thought to be a combination of Malaria and Typhus, and lost 4,000 men to the disease during the campaign. By comparison only 106 men were killed in action. By 24 August Chatham had decided that the fever had reduced his force too much and the defences of Antwerp were too strong to assault. The campaign ended without the British achieving any of their main objectives. The first British troops were withdrawn on 7 September, though a disease-ravaged garrison was maintained until 9 December. The failure of the campaign led to the resignation of the British prime minister, the Duke of Portland, and his replacement by Spencer Perceval.

=== Austro-Polish War ===
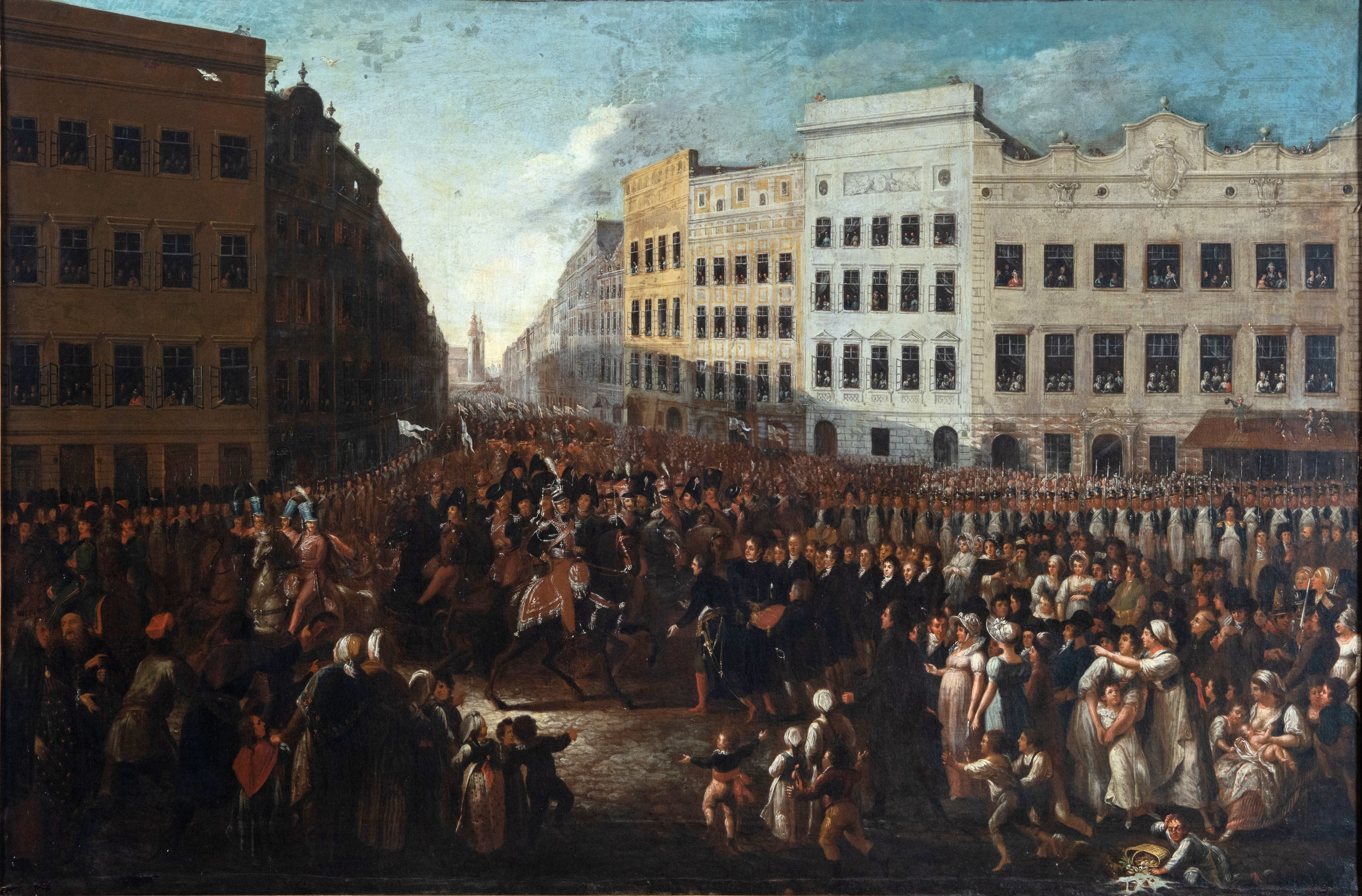
Prince Józef Poniatowski entering Kraków in July 1809

Austria invaded the Duchy of Warsaw with initial success. Poniatowski's army lost to the Austrians at the Battle of Raszyn on 19 April and Warsaw was occupied four days later, with the occupation lasting until 1 June. The Poles went on to invade Galicia, with some success, but the offensive quickly stalled with heavy casualties. The Austrians also won a few battles but were hampered by Russian troops whose intentions were unclear and did not allow them to advance.

After the Austrian invasion of the Duchy of Warsaw, Russia reluctantly entered the war against Austria to fulfil their treaty of alliance with France. The Russian army, under the command of General Sergei Golitsyn, crossed into Galicia on 3 June 1809. Golitsyn advanced as slowly as possible, with instructions to avoid any major confrontation with the Austrians. There were minor skirmishes between the Russian and Austrian troops, with minimal losses. The Austrian and Russian commanders were in frequent correspondence and shared some operational intelligence. A courteous letter sent by a Russian divisional commander, General Andrei Gorchakov, to Archduke Ferdinand was intercepted by the Poles, who sent an original to Emperor Napoleon and a copy to Tsar Alexander, resulting in Gorchakov's removal from command by Alexander. There were constant disagreements between Golitsyn and Poniatowski, with whom the Russians were supposed to cooperate in Galicia. As a result of the Treaty of Schönbrunn, Russia received the Galician district of Tarnopol.

=== The war at sea ===
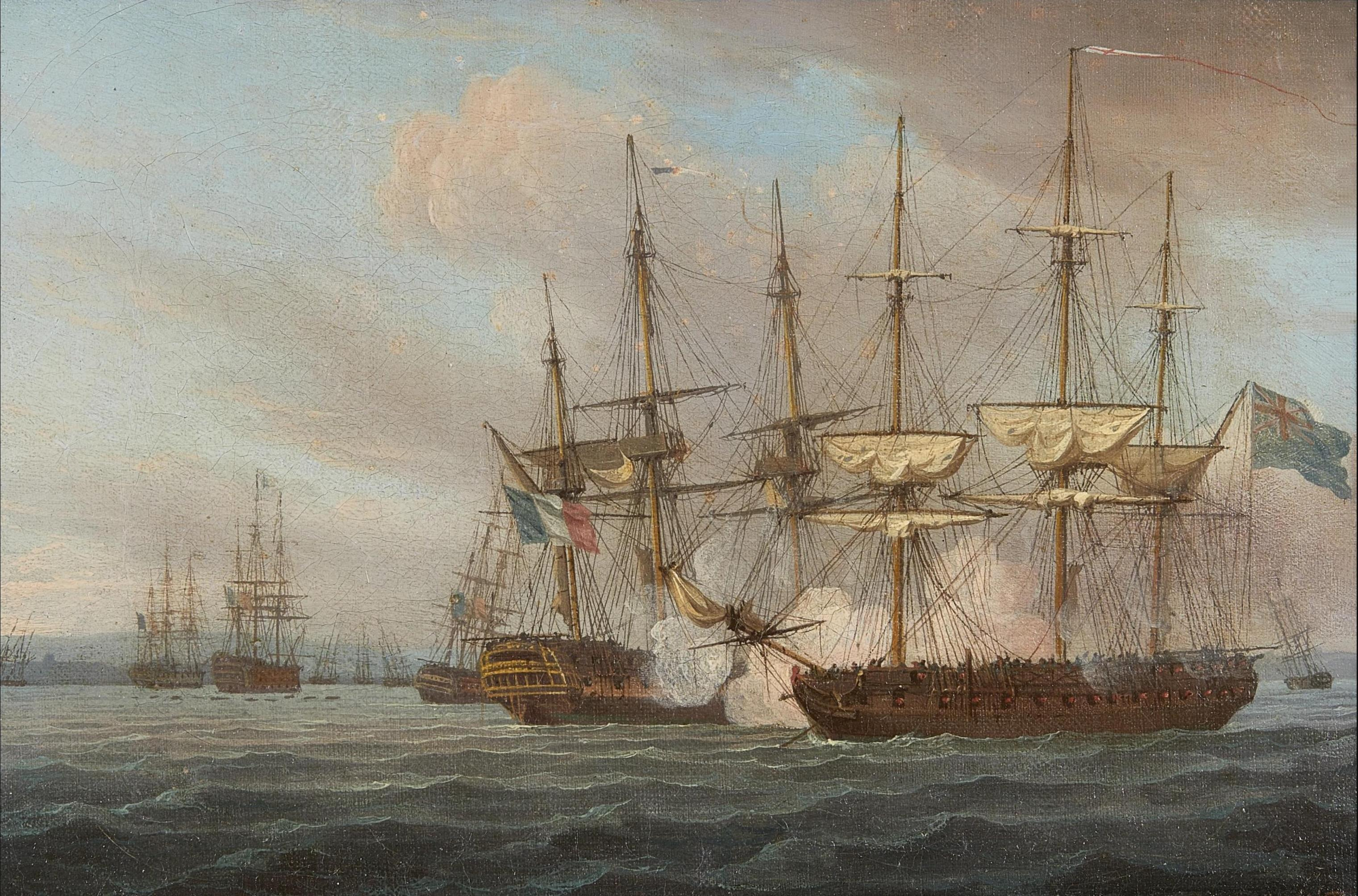
The Battle of the Basque Roads

Since Britain became involved in French Revolutionary and Napoleonic Wars in 1793, the Royal Navy had launched numerous attacks on French warships, merchantmen, ports and colonies. By 1809, the British navy had established command of the sea after defeating the French in the Trafalgar campaign and Atlantic campaign of 1806, blockading remaining French warships in fortified ports across France. France's colonies in the West Indies and Indian Ocean served as a source of refuge and resupply for French warships and privateers, making them a major threat to British commercial interests.

Blockaded in Brest by a British fleet under Vice-admiral James Gambier, the French Atlantic Squadron was keen to slip away to the West Indies following the British invasion of Martinique in January 1809. A storm in February scattered Gambier's fleet and allowed the Atlantic Squadron, under Counter-Admiral Jean-Baptiste Philibert Willaumez, to put to sea and anchor in the Basque Roads. On 23 February, three French frigates attempting to join the main fleet were damaged beyond repair by a British squadron. As Willaumez's ships had anchored near coastal batteries, a stalemate ensued.

Willaumez was replaced by Vice-admiral Zacharie Allemand on 16 March, who consolidated the anchorage defences. The British Admiralty sent Captain Thomas Cochrane to lead an attack on Allemand's fleet. Cochrane's assault on 11 April with fire ships spread havoc among the French, with many of their vessels running aground. Gambier failed to capitalise on the situation by sending in his main fleet, though Cochrane's smaller force destroyed three French ships of the line and a frigate; a fourth ship of the line was scuttled. The battle confined most of the French navy to its anchorages and enabled the Spanish reconquest of Santo Domingo in mid-1809 and British invasion of Guadeloupe in early 1810.

== Rebellions against French rule ==
=== Italian rebellions ===
Archduke John issued proclamations in April 1809 calling on the population of Veneto to rise up against the French for the sake of Italian nationalism. A portion of the population of Venice, including many criminals, rose up and took over public buildings, destroying taxation and conscription records. The revolt continued after the withdrawal of Austrian forces in May, spreading to the rest of Veneto. The rebels were inspired by the Tyrolean Rebellion. The French garrison and militia were unable to contain the rebels, who were unplacated by the abolition of French taxes on flour, meat and wine. Many towns in Veneto came under rebel control and rebels entered Emilia-Romagna where Bologna was threatened and Ferrara was besieged for ten days. The rebellion ended in November 1809 and Napoleon reacted strongly: 4,000 troops were sent to Bologna from Naples and 675 citizens arrested, of whom 150 were killed. In the mountains and marshes of the region, some rebels remained and acted as brigands until the end of French occupation.

=== Rebellion in Tyrol ===
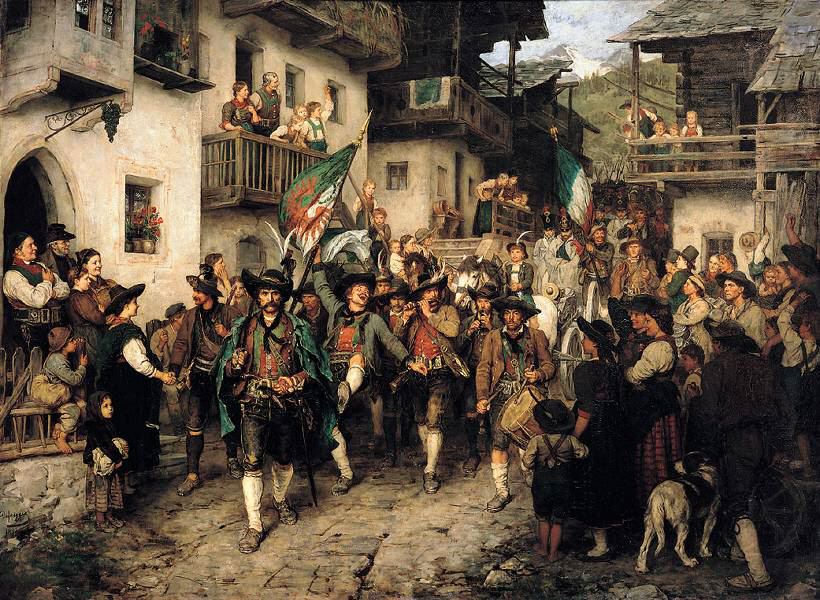
A 1901 depiction of Tyrol rebels

In Tyrol, Andreas Hofer led a rebellion against Bavarian rule and French domination that resulted in early isolated victories in the first Battles of Bergisel. Hofer freed the Tyrol of Bavarian occupation by late August but on 29 September an Italian force under Luigi Gaspare Peyri captured Trento, though they could advance no further. The next month, with troops made available after the Treaty of Schönbrunn, a Bavarian force under Jean-Baptiste Drouet, Comte d'Erlon travelled to end the rebellion. Supported by Franco-Italian forces, a three-pronged attack occupied the region with 45,000 troops by early November. Hofer went into hiding but was betrayed by one of his men in January 1810 and executed by the French.

=== Gottscheer rebellion ===
One of the counties ceded to France was Gottschee (in modern-day Slovenia), which was to form part of the Illyrian Provinces. The ethnic German population, the Gottscheers, led by Johann Erker, rebelled against the French garrison. Rebels were quickly defeated and the French intended to burn down the city of Gottschee. After petitions from local clergy this was not carried out, but the city was looted for a period of three days from 16 October.

=== Black Brunswickers ===
The Duchy of Brunswick had been incorporated into the French client state of the Kingdom of Westphalia but its duke, Frederick William, sided with the Austrians in 1809. His force of a few thousand volunteer Brunswickers fought alongside Austrian troops under General Kienmayer in Saxony, a French client state led by Frederick Augustus I. They were successful, defeating a corps under the command of Junot at the Battle of Gefrees. After taking the Saxon capital, Dresden, and pushing back an army under the command of Napoleon's brother, Jérôme Bonaparte, the Austrians were effectively in control of all of Saxony. By this time, the main Austrian force had already been defeated at Wagram and the Armistice of Znaim had been agreed. The Duke of Brunswick refused to be bound by the armistice and led his corps on a fighting march right across Germany to the mouth of the River Weser, from where they sailed to England and entered British service.

== Aftermath ==
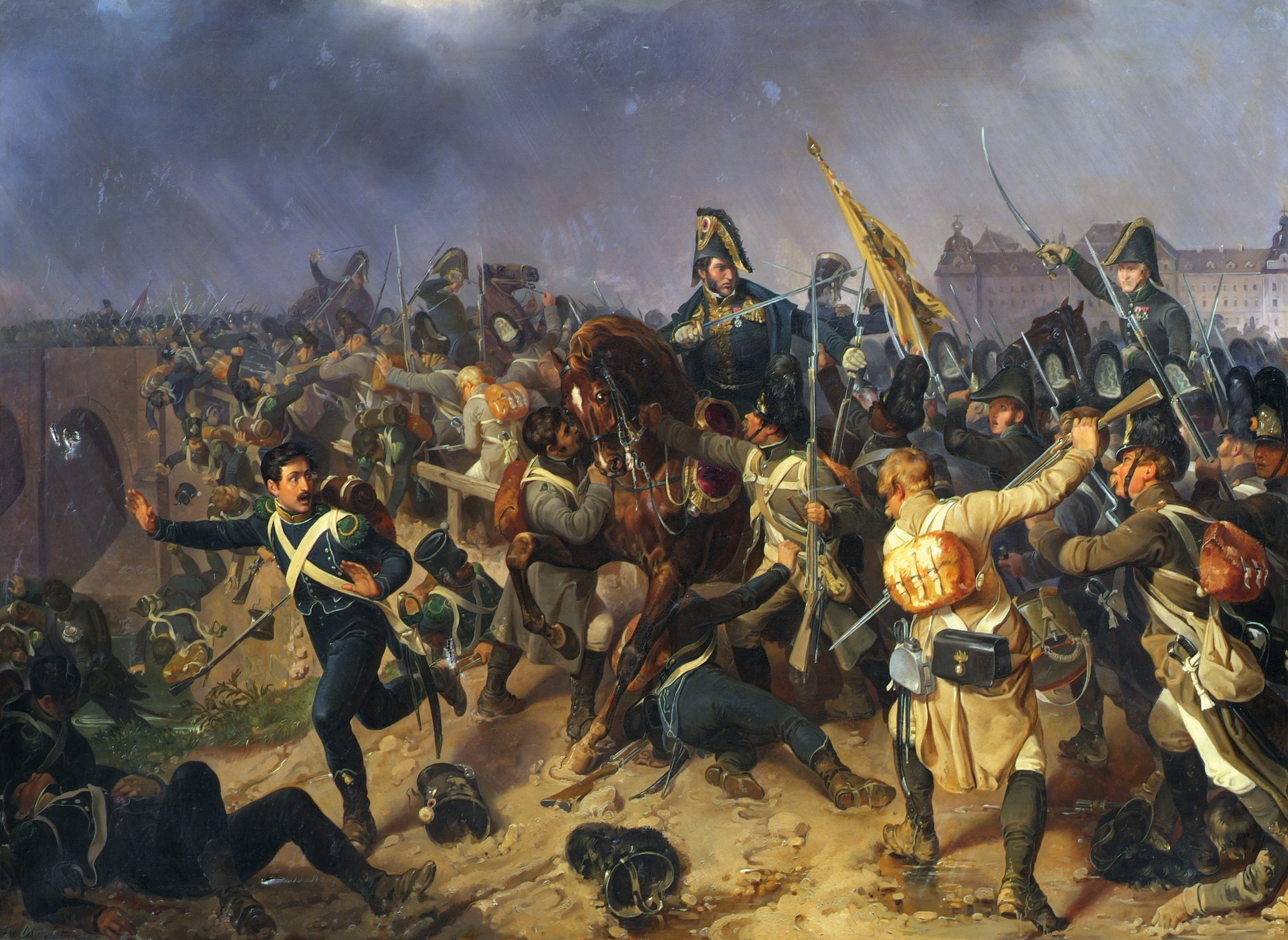
The Battle of Znaim was the last action between Austria and France in the War of the Fifth Coalition

After the main Austrian force was defeated at Wagram, the nation's forces collapsed, according to historian Charles Esdaile, and Emperor Francis was forced to sue for peace. Englund attributes the end to "diplomatic considerations" and believes that Austria could have continued to fight. The Treaty of Schönbrunn, signed on 14 October 1809, imposed a heavy political toll on the Austrians. Metternich and Charles succeeded in negotiating lighter terms in return for Austrian co-operation and most of the hereditary Habsburg territories were preserved. The lands given to the French were significant and included Carinthia, Carniola, and the Adriatic ports, removing Austria's access to the Mediterranean. West Galicia was given to the Duchy of Warsaw. The lands of the short-lived Duchy of Salzburg, acquired by Austria as territorial compensation for losses on the Adriatic Coast and the loss of Tyrol in the Peace of Pressburg, were transferred to Bavaria. Russia was ceded the district of Tarnopol. Austria lost over three million subjects, about 20% of the empire's total population. Emperor Francis agreed to pay an indemnity equivalent to almost 85 million francs, gave recognition to Napoleon's brother Joseph as the King of Spain, and reaffirmed the exclusion of British trade from his remaining dominions. After the Austrian defeat, Napoleon married the daughter of Emperor Francis, Marie Louise. Napoleon hoped the marriage would cement a Franco-Austrian alliance and provide legitimacy to his regime. The alliance gave Austria respite from war with France, which it had pursued on and off for ten years, and restored her status as a great European power; however, marital ties did not prevent Francis from declaring war on France in 1813.

The impact of the conflict was not all positive from the French perspective. The revolts in Tyrol and the Kingdom of Westphalia during the conflict were an indication that there was discontent over French rule among the German population. Just a few days before the conclusion of the Treaty of Schönbrunn, an 18-year-old German named Friedrich Staps approached Napoleon during an army review and attempted to stab the emperor, but he was intercepted by General Rapp. The emerging forces of German nationalism were strongly rooted by this time, and the War of the Fifth Coalition nurtured their development. In 1813, during the War of the Sixth Coalition, there were anti-French risings and spontaneous guerrilla activity, though whether this was fuelled by pan-German nationalism or patriotism for the old order is debated by historians; a united Germany did not come about until 1871.

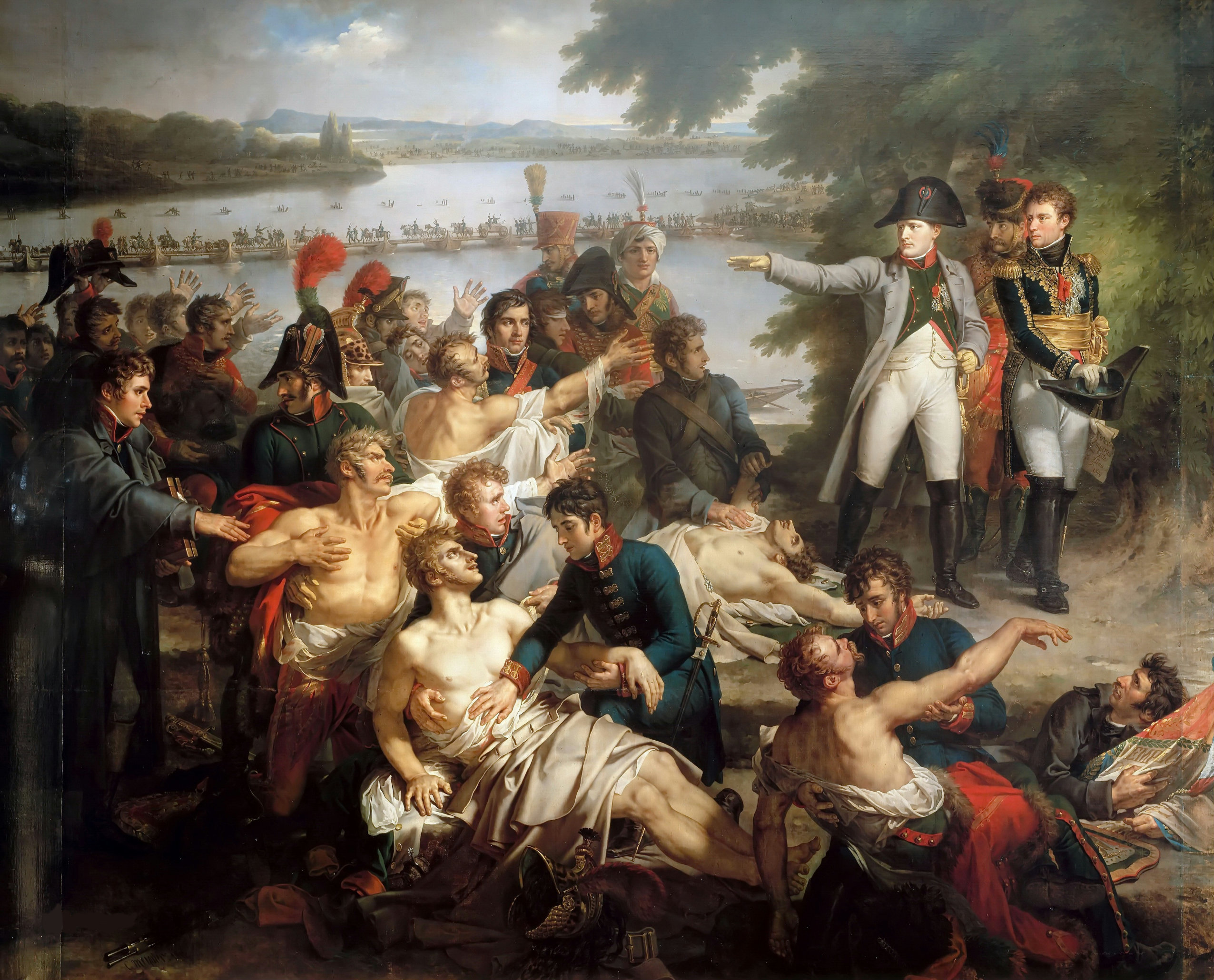
Return of Napoleon to the Isle of Lobau after the Battle of Essling, 23 May 1809

The war undermined French military superiority and the Napoleonic image. The Battle of Aspern-Essling was the first major defeat in Napoleon's career and was warmly greeted by much of Europe. The Austrians had shown that strategic insight and tactical ability were no longer a French monopoly. The decline in the tactical skill of the French infantry led to increasingly heavy columns of foot soldiers eschewing manoeuvres and relying on sheer weight of numbers to break through, a development best emphasized by MacDonald's attack at Wagram. The Armée d'Allemagne did not have the qualitative edge of the Grande Armée partly because raw conscripts replaced many of the veterans of Austerlitz and Jena, eroding tactical flexibility. Napoleon's armies were increasingly composed of non-French contingents, undermining morale. Although Napoleon's manoeuvers were successful, as evidenced by overturning the awful initial French position, the growing size of his armies made military strategies more difficult to manage. The scale of warfare grew too large for Napoleon to fully manage, which became evident during the next Napoleonic war, the French invasion of Russia in 1812.

Englund describes the war as "the first modern war" for the use of "symmetrical conscript armies of singularly large size," that were divided into corps and commanded decentralized in theatres. He concludes that "it was a war of magnitude and maneuver more than before and the decisive factor was attrition, more than dramatic one (or two) day pitched battles."

== Bibliography ==
- Adkins, Roy; Adkins, Lesley (2011). The War For All The Oceans: From Nelson at the Nile to Napoleon at Waterloo. London: Little, Brown Book Group. ISBN 978-1-4055-1343-2.
- Arnold, James R. (1990). Crisis on the Danube: Napoleon's Austrian campaign of 1809. London: Arms and Armour. ISBN 1-85409-083-6.
- Arnold, James R. (1995). Napoleon Conquers Austria: The 1809 Campaign for Vienna. Westport, Connecticut: Greenwood Publishing Group. ISBN 978-0-275-94694-4.
- Bamford, Andrew (2013). Sickness, Suffering, and the Sword: The British Regiment on Campaign, 1808–1815. Norman, Oklahoma: University of Oklahoma Press. ISBN 978-0-8061-8932-1.
- Bienkowski, Lee (2003). Admirals in the age of Nelson. Annapolis, Maryland: Naval Institute Press. ISBN 978-1-55750-002-1.
- Bodart, Gaston (1916). Losses of Life in Modern Wars. Oxford: Clarendon Press. ISBN 978-1371465520.
- Brooks, Richard, ed. (2000). Atlas of World Military History. London: HarperCollins. ISBN 0-7607-2025-8.
- Bruce, Robert B. (2008). Fighting Techniques of Napoleonic Age. London: Amber Books. ISBN 978-1-905704-82-8.
- Buttery, David (2016). Wellington Against Soult: The Second Invasion of Portugal, 1809. Barnsley, South Yorkshire: Pen and Sword. ISBN 978-1-4738-7515-9.
- Chandler, David G. (1995) [1966]. The Campaigns of Napoleon. New York: Simon & Schuster. ISBN 0-02-523660-1.
- Clowes, William Laird (1997) [1900]. The Royal Navy, A History from the Earliest Times to 1900, Volume V. London: Chatham Publishing. ISBN 1-86176-014-0.
- Connelly, Owen (2006). Blundering to Glory: Napoleon's Military Campaigns. Lanham, Maryland: Rowman & Littlefield Publishers. ISBN 978-1-4422-1009-7.
- Connelly, Owen (2006b). The Wars of the French Revolution and Napoleon, 1792–1815. London: Routledge. ISBN 978-0-415-23983-7.
- Dwyer, Philip (2013). Citizen Emperor: Napoleon in Power. New Haven, Connectivut: Yale University Press. ISBN 978-0-300-19066-3.
- Englund, Steven (2004). Napoleon : a Political Life. New York: Scribner. ISBN 978-0-684-87142-4. OCLC 1085212315.
- Esdaile, Charles (2003). The Peninsular War. Palgrave Macmillan. ISBN 1-4039-6231-6.
- Esdaile, Charles J. (2002). The French Wars, 1792–1815. London: Routledge. ISBN 0-203-27885-2. OCLC 50175400.
- Fisher, Todd; Fremont-Barnes, Gregory (2004). The Napoleonic Wars: The Rise and Fall of an Empire. Oxford: Osprey Publishing. ISBN 1-84176-831-6.
- Fortescue, Hon. Sir John William (2014). A History Of The British Army – Vol. VII (1809–1810). San Francisco: Lucknow Books. ISBN 978-1-78289-134-5.
- Gill, John H. (2008a). 1809: Thunder on the Danube; Volume I: Abensberg. London: Frontline Books. ISBN 978-1-84832-757-3.
- Gill, John H. (2010). 1809: Thunder on the Danube; Volume III: Wagram and Znaim. London: Frontline Books. ISBN 978-1-84832-547-0.
- Gill, John H. (2020). The Battle of Znaim. Barnsley, South Yorkshire: Greenhill Books. ISBN 978-1-78438-450-0.
- Graves, Donald E. (2010). Dragon rampant : the Royal Welch Fusiliers at war, 1793–1815. London: Pen and Sword. ISBN 978-1-4738-1377-9.
- Gregory, Desmond (2001). Napoleon's Italy: Desmond Gregory. Cranbury, New Jersey: Associated University Presses. ISBN 978-0-8386-3884-2.
- Hagemann, Karen (2006). "Occupation, Mobilization, and Politics: The Anti-Napoleonic Wars in Prussian Experience, Memory, and Historiography". Central European History. 39 (4): 580–610. doi:10.1017/S0008938906000197. ISSN 0008-9389. JSTOR 20457178. S2CID 145284436.
- Haythornthwaite, Philip J (1990). The Napoleonic Source Book. London: Guild Publishing. ISBN 978-1-85409-287-8.
- Haythornthwaite, Philip J. (1998). Who was Who in the Napoleonic Wars. London: Arms & Armour. ISBN 1-85409-391-6.
- Henderson, James (1994) [1970]. The Frigates. London: Leo Cooper. ISBN 0-85052-432-6.
- Kelly, Catherine (2015). War and the Militarization of British Army Medicine, 1793–1830. Ab: Routledge. ISBN 978-1-317-32245-0.
- Johnson, Paul (2003). Napoleon. Phoenix. ISBN 978-1-84212-650-9.
- Lachouque, Henry (1961). The Anatomy of Glory: Napoleon and His Guard, a Study in Leadership. Providence, Rhode Island: Brown University Press. OCLC 1008283258.
- Markham, Felix (2010) [1964]. Napoleon. New York: Signet Classics. ISBN 978-0-451-53165-0.
- Mikaberidze, Alexander (2011). "Non-Belligerent Belligerent Russia and the Franco-Austrian War of 1809". Napoleonica. La Revue. 1 (10): 4–22. doi:10.3917/napo.111.0004.
- Mikaberidze, Alexander (2020). The Napoleonic Wars: A Global History. Oxford: Oxford University Press. ISBN 978-0-19-995106-2.
- Mitchell, A. Wess (2018). The Grand Strategy of the Habsburg Empire. Princeton, New Jersey: Princeton University Press. ISBN 978-0-691-17670-3.
- Mowat, Robert Balmain (1971). The Diplomacy of Napoleon. New York: Russell & Russell. ISBN 978-0-8462-1539-4.
- Muir, Rory (2013). Wellington: The Path to Victory 1769–1814. New Haven, Connecticut: Yale University Press. ISBN 978-0-300-18665-9.
- Neillands, Robin (2003). Wellington & Napoleon: Clash of Arms. Barnsley, South Yorkshire: Pen and Sword. ISBN 978-0-85052-926-5.
- Pagnet, Julian (2005). Wellington's Peninsular War. Barnsley, South Yorkshire: Pen & Sword. ISBN 978-1-84415-290-2.
- Petre, F. Loraine (2003) [1909]. Napoleon and the Archduke Charles. Whitefish: Kessinger Publishing. ISBN 0-7661-7385-2.
- Price, Munro (2014). Napoleon: The End of Glory. Oxford: Oxford University Press. ISBN 978-0-19-938069-5.
- Prince, John Dyneley (1931). "The Gottschee Germans of Slovenia". Proceedings of the American Philosophical Society. 70 (4): 391–398. ISSN 0003-049X. JSTOR 984204.
- Schneid, Frederick C. (2005). Napoleon's Conquest of Europe: The War of the Third Coalition. Westport, Connecticut: Greenwood Publishing Group. ISBN 978-0-275-98096-2.
- Uffindell, Andrew (2003). Great Generals of the Napoleonic Wars. Staplehurst: Spellmount. ISBN 1-86227-177-1.
- Woodman, Richard (2001). The Sea Warriors. London: Constable Publishers. ISBN 1-84119-183-3.
- Woodman, Richard; Gardiner, Robert (2005). The Victory of Seapower: Winning the Napoleonic War 1806–1814. London: Mercury Books. ISBN 1-84560-012-6.
- Zabecki, David T., ed. (2014). Germany at War: 400 Years of Military History [4 volumes]: 400 Years of Military History. Santa Barbara, California: ABC-CLIO. ISBN 978-1-59884-981-3.
