= Livold =

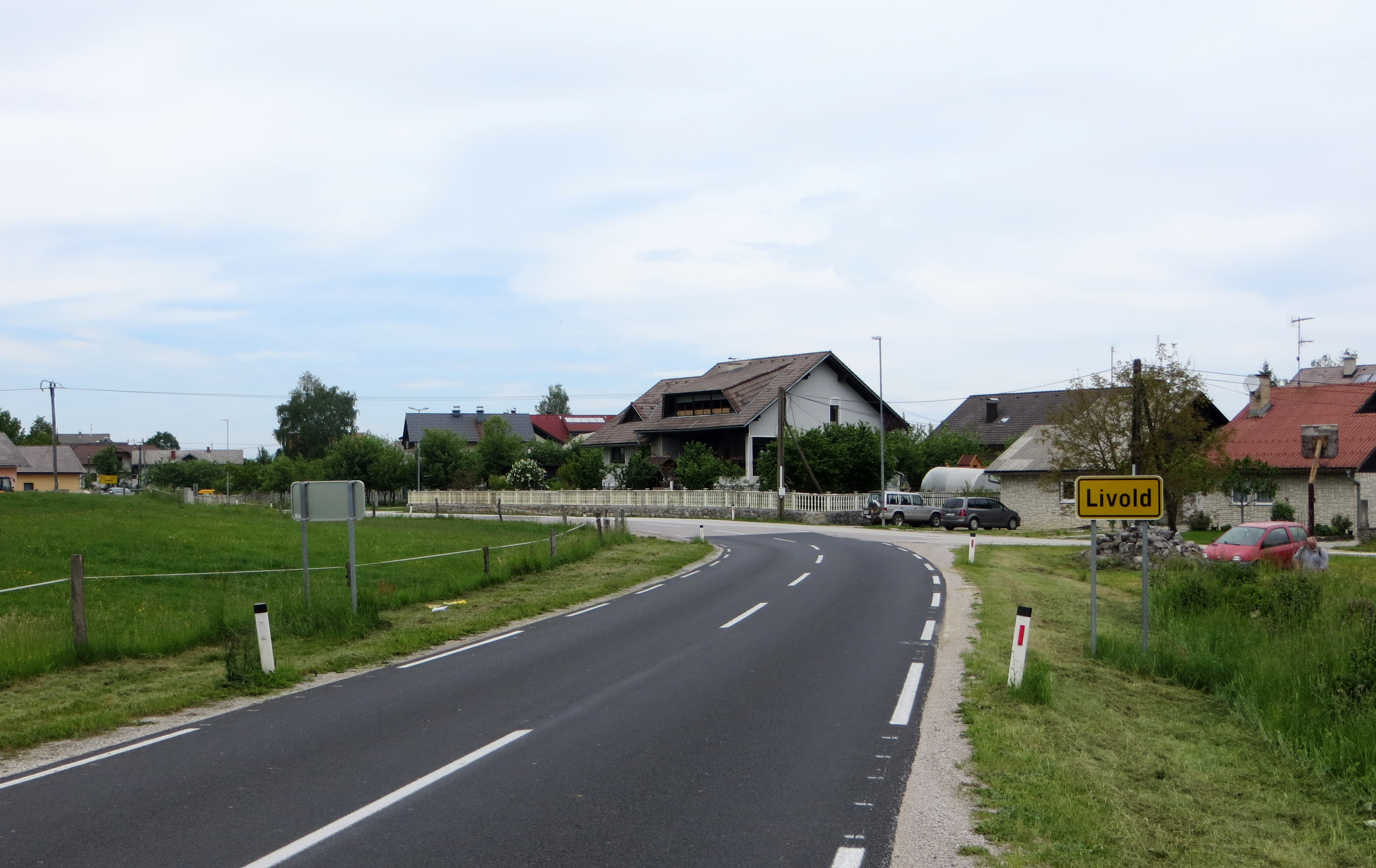

- Location in Slovenia
- Coordinates: 45°34′29.76″N 14°47′57.12″E
- Country: Slovenia
- Traditional region: Lower Carniola
- Statistical region: Southeast Slovenia
- Municipality: Kočevje

Area
  - Total: 13.96 km^{2} (5.39 sq mi)
- Elevation: 567 m (1,860 ft)

Population (2012)
  - Total: 474
  - Density: 34/km^{2} (88/sq mi)
- Postal code: 1338

Livold (pronounced [ˈliːʋɔlt]; German: Lienfeld, Gottscheerish: Liəwold) is a village in the Kočevje Polje southeast of the town of Kočevje in southern Slovenia. The area is part of the traditional region of Lower Carniola and is now included in the Southeast Slovenia Statistical Region. The village stretches along the road connecting Kočevje and Petrina, near the turn to Mozelj. It has a pronounced outline. The Rinža River flows through the village; it often goes dry in the summer but floods during heavy rains. There are many karst caves in the area. The Stojna Ridge and Dry Hill (Slovene: Suhi hrib) rise to the west, and the karstified Šahen lowland lies to the east.

== Name ==
Livold was first attested in 1490 under its German name, Lienfeld. Judging from medieval sources, the Slovene name Livold is derived from Middle High German Lînfeld, literally 'flax field' (from lîn 'flax' + feld 'field'). The name thus refers to local agricultural production. Another theory derives the name from Middle High German leim 'mud, silt', connected with regular flooding of the Rinža River. A third theory relates the name to branching vegetation such as bindweed, ivy, and traveler's joy.

== History ==
In the land registry of 1574, Livold had 10 full farms subdivided into 20 half-farms with 34 owners, corresponding to a population between 120 and 135. The 1770 census recorded 49 houses in the village. During the 1809 Gottscheer Rebellion, Von Gasparini, the French administrator of the Novo Mesto district, was captured in Kočevje by the rebels. Von Gasparini was taken away from his men and murdered in Livold, and his body was thrown into a ditch. A school was established in Livold in 1891 or 1892. Before the Second World War, the village had 67 houses and a population of 364. At that time, its economy was based on agriculture, peddling, and gathering berries. An agricultural and small goods fair was held in the village on 9 January every year. The prewar village population also included a mason, a factory director, a civil servant, a tailor, an accountant, a notary, a driving instructor, a cobbler, and a blacksmith. The original ethnic German population was evicted during the Second World War. After the war, 25 houses remained in use and the village had a population of 103. Many new houses were built in Livold after the war. Water mains were installed in 1952, and these were connected with the Kočevje water system in 1969.

== Church ==
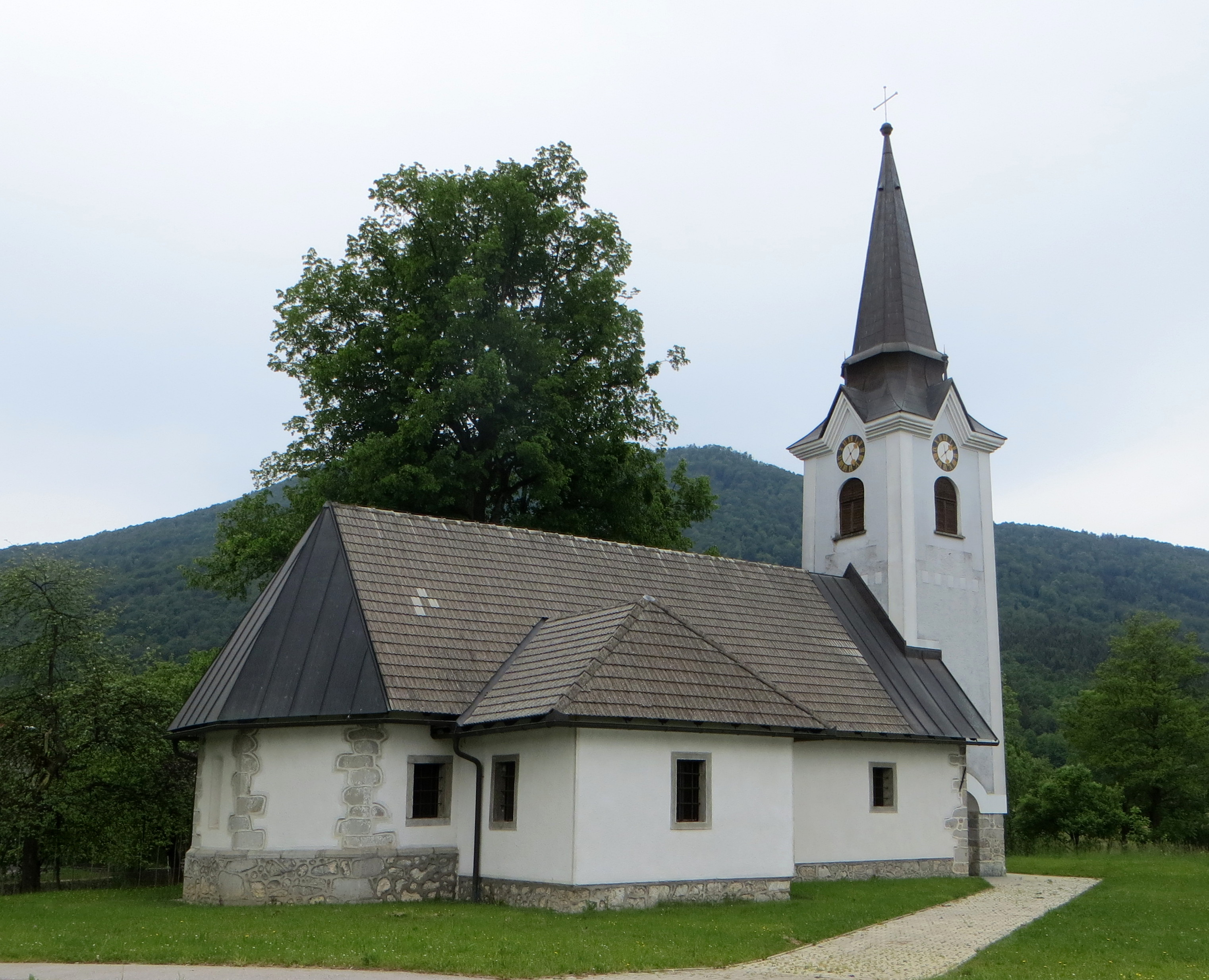
All Saints Church

The local church in the northwestern part of the village is dedicated to All Saints and belongs to the Parish of Kočevje. It is a late Gothic church from the early 16th century that was adapted in the 19th century. The main altar is neo-Gothic. The side one was built later and features a Baroque-style pietà. The chancel has been whitewashed multiple times, but traces of fresco work are still visible. The two bells in the bell tower date from the interwar period. The larger one, dedicated to the Virgin Mary, was cast in Jesenice in 1923, and the smaller one, dedicated to Saint Peter, in Ljubljana in 1928.

== Other cultural heritage ==
In addition to the village church, several other structures in Livold have cultural heritage status:

- The village cemetery lies on the northeast edge of the settlement. It preserves a number of Gottschee German gravestones and also contains two Partisan graves.
- A column shrine stands by a field at the northeastern edge of Livold. It is a Baroque structure with a square base, accentuated edges, and a square hip roof. The upper section is somewhat smaller than the plinth and has niches on all four sides. Paintings were added to the niches in 2005, representing the Pietà, Saint Notburga, Saint Roch, and Anton Martin Slomšek.
- The village itself has been declared a cultural monument. It is a typical example of a ribbon village, with a characteristic skyline and two large linden trees in the center of the settlement.
- A triangular columnar monument with an inscription on two sides is dedicated to the fallen Partisan soldiers and others from Livold that died on the communist side. It was unveiled on 3 October 1965. It stands on a graveled area surrounded by grass where the road to Črnomelj splits off from the main road between Kočevje and Brod na Kupi.

== Notable people ==
Notable people that were born or lived in Livold include:

- Albert Belay (born 1925), Gottschee cultural activist in New York
- Ivan Omerza (a.k.a. Janez/Johan Oberstar, 1921–1943), Partisan telephone operator and People's Hero of Yugoslavia
