= Albert Belay =

German activist (born 1925)

Albert T. Belay (born May 24, 1925) is a Gottschee German cultural activist in New York City.

== Life and career ==
Belay was born in Livold (German: Lienfeld), Slovenia on May 24, 1925. He left the Gottschee region as a teenager, becoming a displaced person in Austria after the Second World War, and then emigrated to the United States in 1951, where he worked as a civil engineer. He married a fellow Gottschee refugee, Therese Erker, in 1953. Belay served as the president of the 1960 Gottscheer Volksfest in New York and headed the cultural committee of the Gottscheer Relief Association for many years. He is also the chairman of the Gottschee German Men's Choir in New York.

He authored the cookbook Hoimischai Khöscht (Home-Style Fare), containing 155 traditional Gottschee German recipes, and narrated the five-part CD series Eine Reise durch Gottschee 1936 (A Journey through Gottschee, 1936). His son, Roland Belay (1955–2020), was a member of the board of Gottscheer Central Holding, which runs Gottscheer Hall in the Ridgewood neighborhood of Queens, New York City.

== Bibliography ==
- Albert Belay. 1993. Hoimischai Khöscht = Heimische Kost: Küchenrezepte aus Gottschee. New York: Author.
- Albert Belay, narrator. 2015. Eine Reise durch Gottschee 1936 (five-part CD set).
