= Richard J. Kramer =

American businessman

Richard Kramer
- Born: October 30, 1963 (age 62); Cleveland, Ohio, U.S.
- Education: John Carroll University (BS)
- Children: 4

Richard J. Kramer (born October 30, 1963) is an American businessman and Certified Public Accountant. He was the chairman, president and chief executive officer of The Goodyear Tire & Rubber Company in Akron, Ohio from 2010 until January 2024.

== Early life and education ==
Kramer was born in Cleveland, Ohio. Kramer is of Gottschee German ancestry. His ancestors were from the German enclave of Gottschee (now the Kočevje region) in the Lower Carniola region of Slovenia. He graduated from John Carroll University and earned a Bachelor of Science degree in business administration in 1986.

== Career ==
After graduating from college, Kramer became a Certified Public Accountant. From 1987 to 2000, he worked at PricewaterhouseCoopers in Cleveland. In 2000, he joined Goodyear as vice president of corporate finance. He became chairman on October 1, 2010, and president and chief executive officer on April 13, 2010. Kramer has been on the Goodyear board of directors since February 23, 2010. His total compensation was $11.07 million in 2011.

He sits on the board of directors of Sherwin-Williams. He also sits on the board of trustees of his alma mater, John Carroll University. A political donor, Kramer has made contributions to Democratic and Republican politicians in Ohio, including Tim Ryan, Sherrod Brown, Mike DeWine, George Voinovich, and Lee Fisher.

== Personal life ==
He is married and has four children.
