= Mala Gora, Kočevje =

Mala Gora
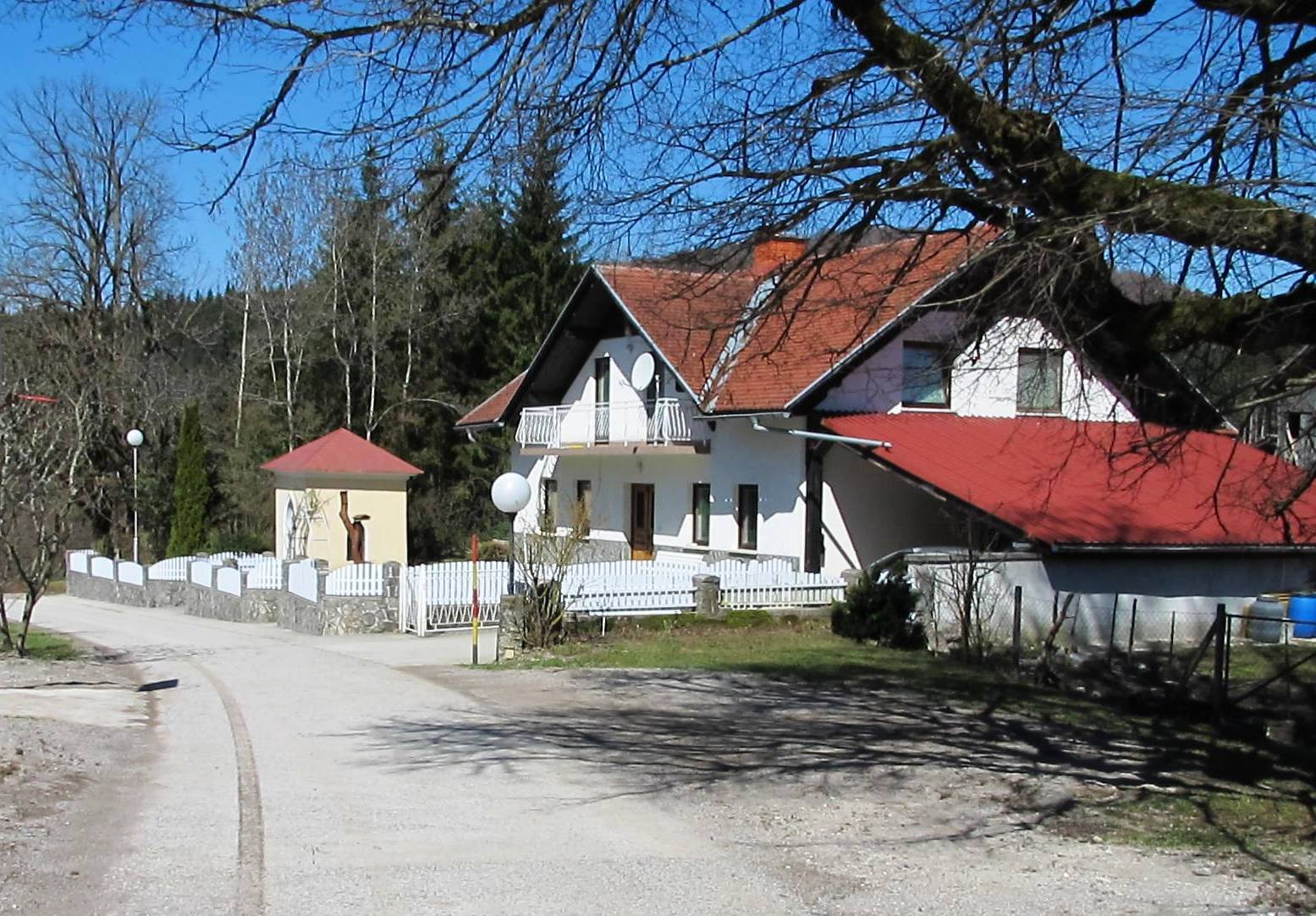

- Location in Slovenia
- Coordinates: 45°41′22.82″N 14°52′8.95″E
- Country: Slovenia
- Traditional region: Lower Carniola
- Statistical region: Southeast Slovenia
- Municipality: Kočevje

Area
  - Total: 11.36 km^{2} (4.39 sq mi)
- Elevation: 487.6 m (1,600 ft)

Population (2002)
  - Total: 10
- Postal code: 1332

Mala Gora (pronounced [ˈmaːla ˈɡɔːɾa]; German: Malgern) is a settlement in the hills north of the town of Kočevje in southern Slovenia. It was a village settled by Gottschee Germans. During the Second World War its original population was expelled. The area is part of the traditional region of Lower Carniola and is now included in the Southeast Slovenia Statistical Region.

== Name ==
It is hypothesized that the name Mala Gora (literally, 'little mountain') was coined by settlers that originated from the Big Mountains (Slovene: Velika gora) chain to the west, as a contrast with the higher-elevation area they had left. The German name Malgern was then derived from the Slovene name.

== History ==
During the 1809 Gottscheer Rebellion, a French captain named Chambelli was murdered in the village of Mala Gora while transporting tax revenues from Novo Mesto to Kočevje. In revenge, the French forces burned Kočevske Poljane and Kostel, looted the town of Kočevje between 16 and 18 October, and executed five men in Kočevje on 18 October.

== Church ==
The local church, dedicated to Saint Nicholas, was built before 1581 and had a painted wooden roof in its nave dating to 1623. It survived the Second World War, but was demolished in 1956.

== Gallery ==
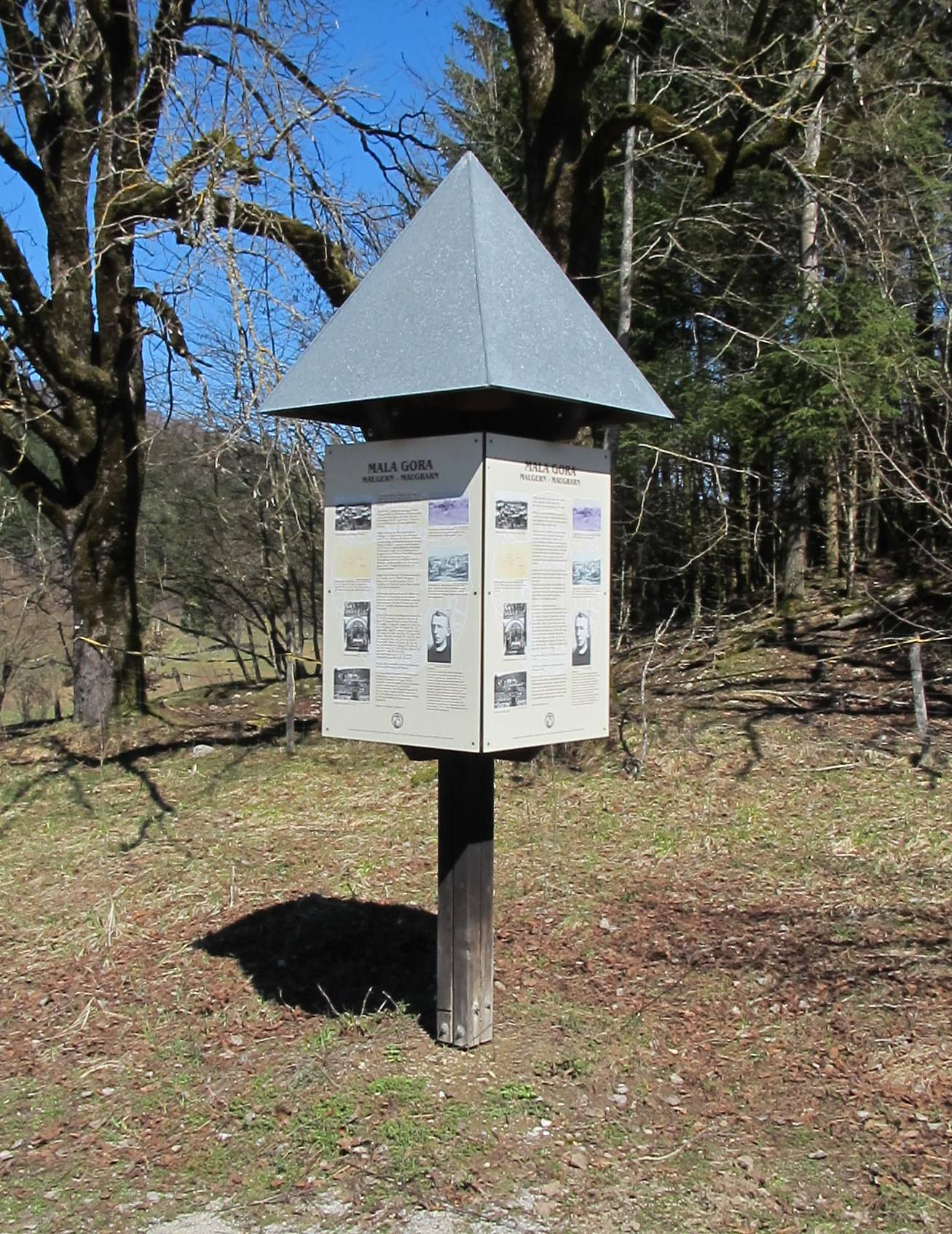
Information sign

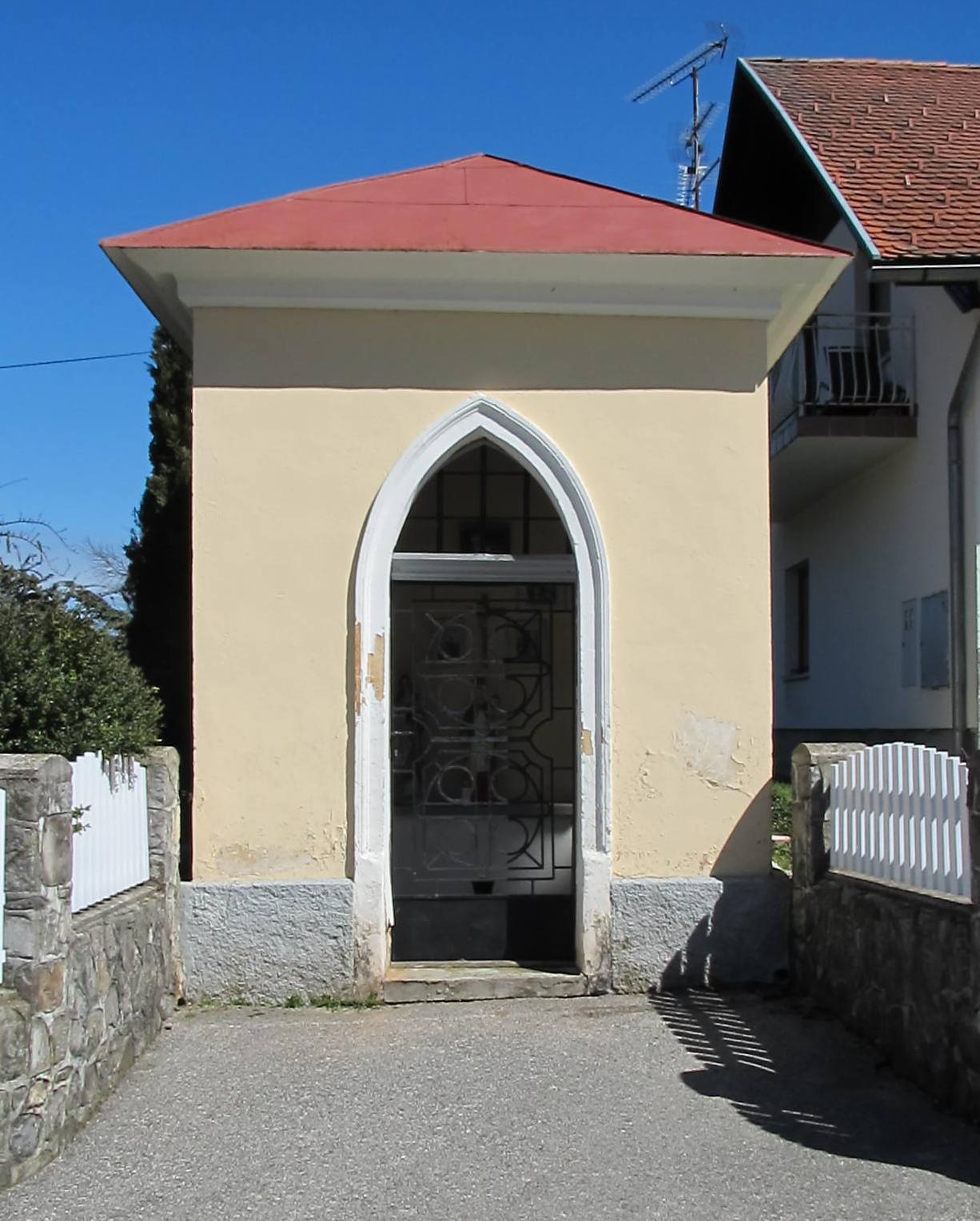
Maucharsch Chapel-Shrine
