= Gottscheers =

German settlers in Slovenia

Göttscheabarə
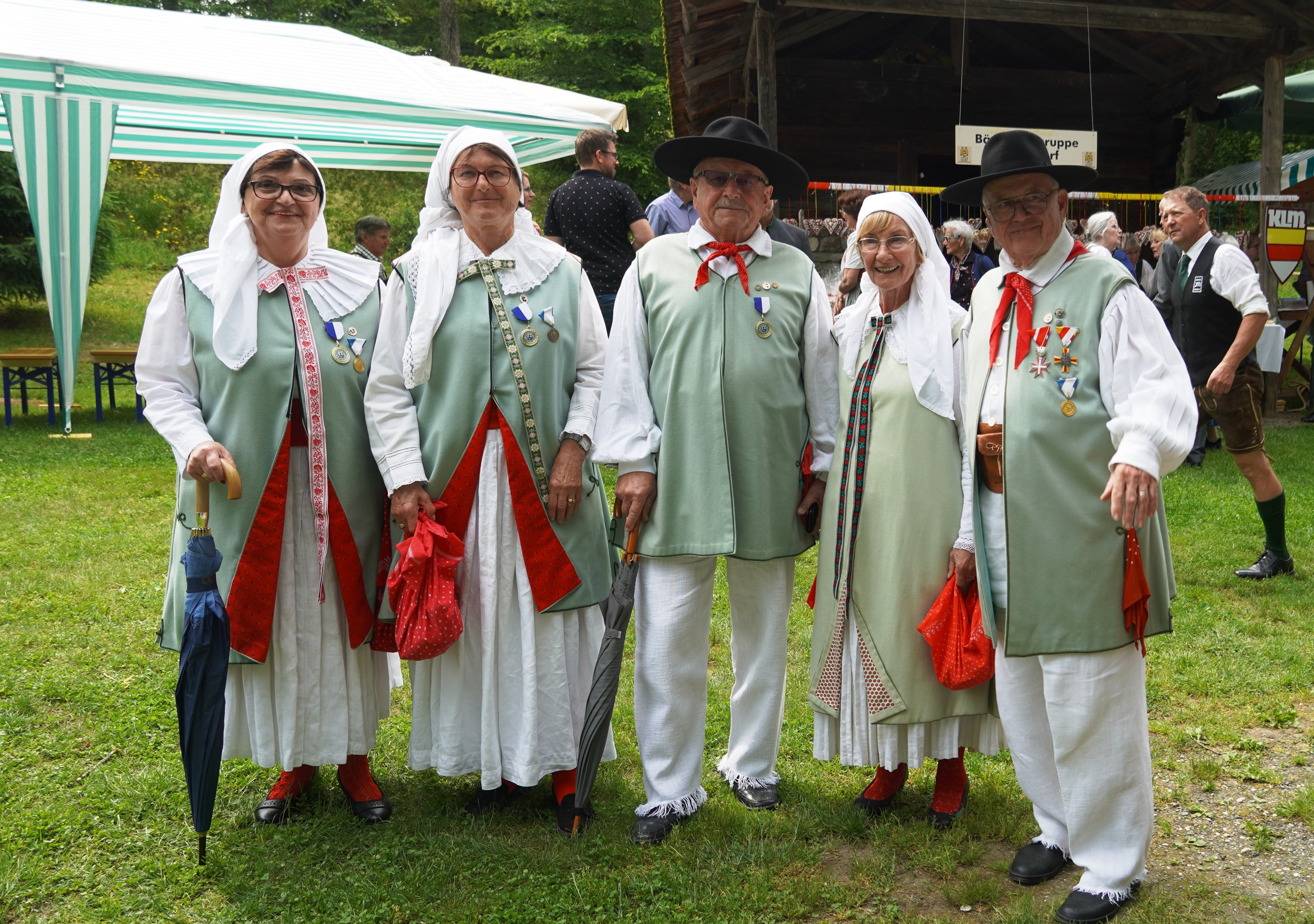
- People dressed in traditional Gottscheer costume at a folk festival in Maria Saal, Austria, 2023

Regions with significant populations
- Gottschee

Languages
- Gottscheerish

Religion
- mostly Catholic

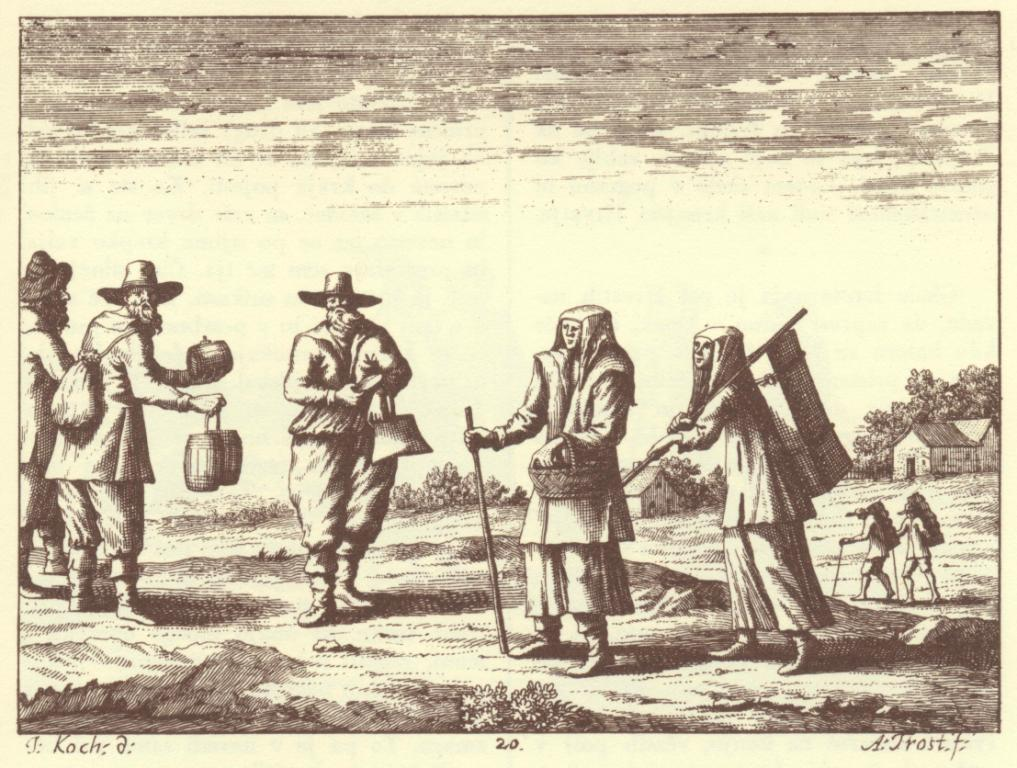
Gottschee German peasants in an engraving from Johann Weikhard von Valvasor's work The Glory of the Duchy of Carniola, 17th century

Gottscheers (German: Gottscheer, Slovene: Kočevarji, kočevski Nemci) are the German settlers of the Kočevje region (a.k.a. Gottschee) of Slovenia, formerly Gottschee County. Until the Second World War, their main language of communication was Gottscheerish, a Bavarian dialect of German.

== History ==
=== Duchy of Carniola ===
In 1247, Berthold, Patriarch of Aquileia, transferred fiefdom of Ribnica and its Lower Carniolan environs to the Counts of Ortenburg, a Carinthian noble family. This area included the primeval forest area that would eventually become known as the Gottschee. In 1336, Patriarch Bertrand of Saint-Geniès reaffirmed and expanded the rights and responsibilities of Otto V of Ortenburg and his successors as rulers of the area. Starting in 1330 and continuing until circa 1400, the Counts of Ortenburg settled German peasants from East Tyrol and Carinthia within their fiefdom. In 1377, the town of Gottschee, the foremost among the German towns in the region, received market rights, and in 1406 Count Frederick III of Ortenburg granted the growing German population the right to collect estovers from the region's forests.

With the extinction of the House of Ortenburg in 1418, the region came under the control of the Counts of Celje; following the assassination of Ulrich II of Celje in 1456, the House of Habsburg gained the region for itself.

Owing to its position on the outer edge of the Habsburg domains, the area of Gottschee was often threatened by Ottoman incursions, and the Gottscheers were regularly forced into military service to protect the area. The town of Gottschee itself was sacked in 1469, but following its speedy rebuilding, Emperor Frederick III bestowed town privileges unto it. Importantly, Frederick III also granted Gottscheer men the right to peddle their wares tax-free (known as the Hausiererpatent) throughout the empire on 23 October 1492.

Peddling would thereafter become a crucial source of supplemental income for the Gottscheers, who remained isolated subsistence farmers from their settlement up until their dispersement after the Second World War. Gottscheer peddlers sold homespun linens, dormouse pelts, and wooden toys, among other wares, throughout the Holy Roman and later Austro-Hungarian and German Empires. In the 18th century, their right to peddle was expanded to produce from the southern reaches of the empire, and by the time that Gottschee was incorporated into Yugoslavia, they also sold exotic fruits and sweets. The Gottscheers peddled on foot through the winter, and returned in the springtime to tend to the family's plot, staying at home until the end of harvest season in November.

In 1507, the Gottschee was pledged to Jörg von Thurn (Jurij Turn), who became hated by his subjects for introducing heavy-handed tax farming and interest collection. Gottscheer peasants eventually killed von Thurn, sparking the Slovene peasant revolt, which would continue to rage throughout what is now Slovenia and parts of Austria until it was put down in 1515.

In 1524, sovereignty over the Gottschee was bought by Hans Ungnad, and soon after, by the Croatian Counts of Blagay in 1547. Croatian rule lasted less than a century, but during that time, many Gottscheers added the ending -itsch to their surnames, derived from the common Croatian -ić suffix. In 1618, the Gottschee was sold to Freiherr Johann Jakob Khisl, who founded the County of Gottschee and styled himself Count of Gottschee. His adoptive son promptly sold the county to Wolf Engelbrecht of Auersperg in 1641. In 1677, Johann Weikhard of Auersperg made the county a fideicommissum of the House of Auersperg, securing its ownership by the family until the abolition of Austria-Hungary. In 1791, Emperor Leopold II elevated the County of Gottschee to a Dukedom.

From 1809 to 1814, the Gottschee was occupied by the forces of Emperor Napoleon and incorporated into the Illyrian Provinces. However, the Napoleonic takeover was not without incident, as the Gottscheers rose up against the French in 1809, scoring some minor victories before being brutally crushed. After the French left the area, control of the Dukedom reverted to the House of Auersperg. In 1848, serfdom was abolished, and in 1871, the regions first Gymnasium was built in the town of Gottschee, a decade later, a trade school of woodwork was founded in the same town. in 1893, Gottschee gained its first rail connection with a line running from the town of Gottschee to Ljubljana, and one year later, the House of Auersperg erected a sawmill, the first major industrial site in the region.

Between 1869 and 1878, the German population of Gottschee reached its zenith at a population of around 26,000. However, despite modernization, the region remained desperately poor and its population chiefly dependent on subsistence farming. From 1880, the Gottschee would begin losing population to emigration to the United States and Canada. Combined with the effects of anti-German discrimination in the newly formed Kingdom of Yugoslavia, the Gottschee German population had been reduced to 12,500 by the German invasion of 1941.

=== Kingdom of Yugoslavia ===
Following the dissolution of the Austro-Hungarian Empire, the Gottschee became part of the newly formed Kingdom of Yugoslavia in 1918. The incorporation of the language island into the Slavic state was not without resistance from the Gottschee Germans. Gottscheer emigrants in the United States lobbied for recognition of their people's right to self-determination, however, the enclave's small size and even smaller population meant that it was incorporated into Yugoslavia despite Gottschee German disapproval.

Despite claims that the Kingdom of Yugoslavia would constitutionally protect minority rights, on January 1, 1919, all German teachers and civil servants in the state were dismissed. The Gymnasium of Gottschee was made into a Slovene-language institution, and the town's trade school was shut down along with 22 German civic organizations and clubs. By 1939, only five German classes were offered in the entire region's elementary schools. Attempts to form German cultural organizations were continuously squashed, due to the Yugoslav government's increasing fear of German nationalist sentiment emanating from Germany and Austria. Despite these hardships, in 1930, a 600-year celebration of Gottschee was held.

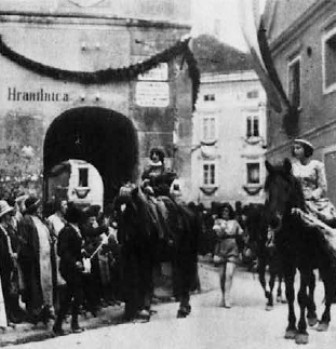
Parade during the 600 year anniversary celebrations, 1930

In 1939, the ban on the German Cultural Organization (Kulturbund) were lifted, in return for alleged better treatment for Carinthian Slovenes by the Third Reich. National Socialist activist Wilhelm Lampeter was easily able to found a paramilitary organization, the Mannschaft, from the reconstituted Cultural Organization, and serious agitation for "repatriation" to Germany began.

=== Second World War ===
Following the swift German invasion of 6 April 1941, the Mannschaft's paramilitaries took control of the Gottschee. On 13 April, Wilhelm Lampeter took office as Bezirkshauptmann (District Leader) of the Gottschee in the old city palace of the Auerspergs in the town of Gottschee. However, Lampeter promptly was forced to step down from this post on 23 April, after the region became part of the Province of Ljubljana, an Italian occupation zone. On October 1 of the same year, Adolf Hitler and Benito Mussolini reached a resettlement treaty, and plans to resettle the Gottscheers devised by the Main Welfare Office for Ethnic Germans (VoMi) were put into action. Members of the Mannschaft quickly initiated the resettlement across the region. Resettling Gottscheers were allowed to take some household belongings and 1/3 of their livestock with them. Ostensibly, the vacated land was to be given to Italian settlers, however, due to the intensity of partisan attacks in the area, Italian settlement was never implemented.

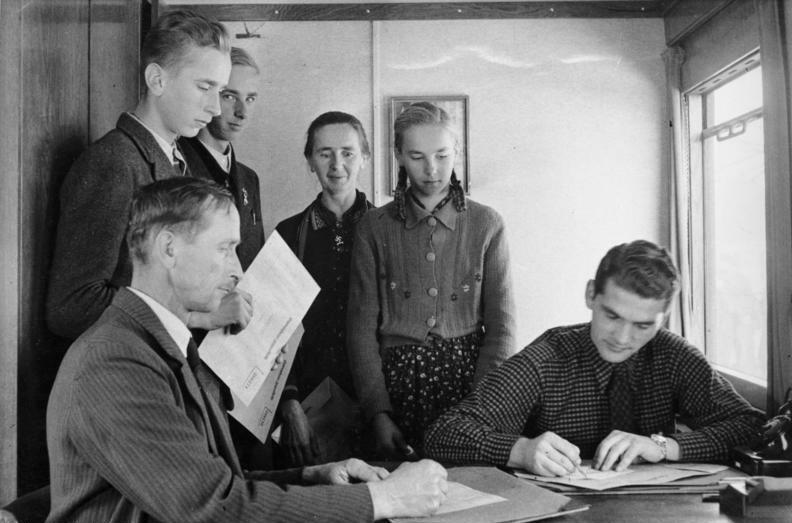
Ethnic Germans from Gottschee facing resettlement in 1941

The Gottscheers were to be resettled from the Italian-annexed territory to the Rann Triangle (German: Ranner Dreieck), the region in Lower Styria between the confluences of the Krka, Sotla, and Sava rivers.

To achieve their goal, accommodation had to be made for the Gottschee settlers and, beginning in November 1941, some 46,000 Slovenes from the Rann Triangle region were deported to eastern Germany for potential Germanisation or forced labor. Shortly before that, propaganda aimed at both the Gottscheers and the Slovenes promised the latter equivalent farmland in Germany for the land relinquished in Lower Styria. The Gottscheers were given Reich passports and transportation to the Rann area straight after the forced departure of the Slovenes. Most left their homes following coercion and threats as the VoMi had set 31 December 1941 as the deadline for the movement of both groups. Though many Gottscheers received houses and farmland, inevitably there was great dissatisfaction that many properties were of lesser value and quality than their original lands, and many were in disarray after the hasty expulsion of their previous occupants.

From the time of their arrival until the end of the war, Gottscheer farmers were harassed and sometimes killed by Yugoslav partisans who saw them as an instrument of the Axis powers. Among these partisans were Slovenes who had escaped deportation from the Rann Triangle to the surrounding forests.The attempt to resettle the Gottscheers proved a costly failure for the Nazi regime, which needed to deploy extra manpower to protect the farmers from the partisans. The deported Slovenes were taken to several camps in Saxony, Silesia, and elsewhere in Germany, where they were forced to work on German farms or in factories from 1941 to 1945. The laborers were not always kept in formal internment, but often in nearby vacant buildings. After the end of the war, most returned to Yugoslavia to find their homes destroyed.

=== After the war ===
By 1945, nearly all Gottscheers had fled the Rann Triangle for Austria, stragglers were interned and later expelled in the aftermath of treaties between the defeated Germans and the Yugoslav Partisans. The Gottscheers became stateless refugees in Austria. In the aftermath of the war, around 3,000 stayed in Austria and 2,000 immigrated to Germany, while the remainder immigrated to the United States and Canada. By all accounts, less than 400 ethnic Germans found themselves in the new Socialist Republic of Slovenia, with OZNA counting a mere 110.

The vast majority of Gottscheers and their descendants now live in the United States, mainly in New York City and Cleveland, but also in other parts of the country. Smaller numbers have settled in Kitchener, Ontario, along with those who remained in Europe. Gottscheer Hall in Ridgewood, Queens serves as a cultural hub and gathering place for the community.

== Notable Gottscheers ==
Notable Gottschee Germans or people with Gottschee German heritage include:

- Albert Belay (born 1925), cultural activist
- Doris Debenjak (1936–2013), linguist and translator
- Johann Erker (1781–1809), Austrian rebel leader
- Peter Kosler (1824–1879), lawyer and geographer
- Richard J. Kramer (born 1963), American businessman
- Michael J. Krische (born 1966), American chemist and professor
- Roman Erich Petsche (1907–1993), educator
- Ernest Pogorelc (1838–1892), photographer
- Andrew Poje (born 1987), Canadian ice dancer
- Werner Roth (soccer) (born April 4, 1948), professional soccer player
- August Schauer (1872–1941), Roman Catholic priest and publisher
