= 1809 Gottscheer rebellion =

1809 rebellion during the War of the Fifth Coalition

- Part of War of the Fifth Coalition
Date	September 10; October 7–18, 1809
Location	Gottschee County, modern day Slovenia 45°38′23″N 14°51′41″E
Result	Execution of rebel leaders; Plundering of the City of Gottschee and burning of several peasant villages; Scattered guerrilla attacks by Gottscheer farmers begin; French occupation of Carniola is enforced

Belligerents
(Austrian Empire) Gottschee Germans	(France) First French Empire

Commanders and leaders
(Austrian Empire) Mathias Dulzer (executed) (Austrian Empire) Johann Erker (executed) (Austrian Empire) Georg Eisenzopf (executed) (Austrian Empire) Bartholomäus Kusold (executed) (Austrian Empire) Johann Jonke (executed)	(France) District Commissioner Gasparini † (France) General Carlo Zucchi (France) Captain Luigi Tarducci

Strength
c. 2,000 Gottscheers c. 500 Slovenes Total: c. 2,500	2nd Italian Light Infantry Regiment; 8th Italian Infantry Regiment; Unknown Artillery Unit; Unknown Cavalry Regiment; Garrison troops; Total: 1,300–1,500

Casualties and losses
Unknown, but more than the French	Unknown, but minimal

War of the Fifth Coalition:
Gottscheer rebellion

The 1809 Gottscheer rebellion (German: Gottscheer Bauernaufstand) was a revolt by the Gottschee Germans against the First French Empire during the French occupation of Gottschee following the War of the Fifth Coalition.

== Background: War of the Fifth Coalition and Treaty of Schönbrunn ==
In April 1809, the Austrian Empire declared war against Napoleon I to start the War of the Fifth Coalition. After suffering some major setbacks, notably the Battle of Aspern-Essling, the French swiftly triumphed over the Austrian commander Archduke Charles. At the Battle of Wagram, the French ultimately had already won the war. Following this battle, the French troops marched south to occupy Carniola, and with it Gottschee County, that had been centuries earlier settled by Austrians from Tyrol and Carinthia.

Determined not to be occupied by the French, the German-speaking Gottscheers hastily assembled a local militia who marched north from the City of Gottschee to face the advancing French. At the Battle of Kerndorf, located just north of the City, 900 Gottscheer peasants stood against the French army. In a quick fight, the Gottscheers were thoroughly routed. After this brief episode, the French occupied the remainder of the region with little incident, however French troops were needed to disperse 600 Gottscheer farmers on September 10, 1809, when they protested the new war tax imposed on them. On October 14, 1809, the Treaty of Schönbrunn transferred the region of Carniola, which Gottschee was in, to France along with many other territories.

== The Rebellion ==
It was the riot of September 10 in the town of Gottschee that escalated the turmoil in the Gottschee region and the adjacent Slovene counties. On October 6, a squad of 18 French soldiers entered the Slovene village of Kostel, south of the Gottschee German region. When the French could not find any tax money, they threatened to burn down the town in retribution. The town mayor managed to escape the French, and he rallied the neighboring villagers (mostly Gottschee Germans) and on the morning of October 7 attacked the French squadron in Kostel. After a brief fight, only 1 farmer and 2 French soldiers were wounded. With their backs to the Kolpa River, the French officer surrendered. The rebels then delivered their captives to Austrian positions on the other side of the river, in present-day Croatia. Later that day, once word of the action in Kostel spread, the Slovene villagers of the village of Pölland, also just south of the Gottschee region, drove out a French garrison of 28 men. They fled to nearby Altenmarkt, where the following morning they were surrounded by 300 rebels, a mix of Gottschee Germans and Slovenes. The French surrendered and were summarily marched to the banks of the Kolpa and executed.

News of these victories spread deep into Gottschee and on the early hours of October 9, a swarm of hundreds of rebels from Gottscheer villages near the town fell upon the French troops stationed there under Commissioner Gasparini. Seeing the attack, Gasparini sent a messenger to Reifnitz just as the Gottschee Germans closed in. All the French troops fell back to Auersperg Castle, and a siege ensued for several hours. Finally, the Gottschee Germans broke down the doors and captured and killed the entire garrison. Gasparini was dragged from the fortress, found hiding in a back room. He was dragged through the streets while being kicked and hit and had rocks thrown on him. He finally was killed in the village of Lienfeld, south of the town, and his body unceremoniously disposed of. According to legend, his final words were "Vive L'Empereur". Out of the French defenders in Gottschee, 42 were captured and they were also handed over to the Austrians in Croatia like the prisoners from Kostel. The amount of the total French troops in the town was from 50 to up to 100. Rebel casualties are unknown.

Gasparini's messenger reached Reifnitz after the town fell, and a small detachment was dispatched to go to his aid. However, the relief force never made it as they were waylaid by Gottschee Germans who were hiding along the road before they reached the town and the majority of the unit was killed.

All throughout the Gottschee region in the next few days, the Gottschee German rebels triumphed. They ambushed a French squad between the villages of Schalkendorf and Seele, forcing them to flee into the nearby caves where they either were massacred or surrendered. In the village of Malgern, Captain Chambelli led a tax convoy from Neustadt, which was north of the Gottschee region. The rebels pounced on his caravan, killing at least him and his lieutenant and presumably others.

The victory was short-lived, however. On October 15 the Gottschee Germans and some Slovene peasant farmers who joined them after the initial success assaulted the French garrison in Neustadt. They planned to attack in the early morning, but after many delays the French and Italian soldiers defending were prepared. After some small gains in the early stage of the battle, the Gottschee Germans and other peasants were ultimately driven off by shrapnel from Neustadt's two artillery pieces. In the end, 35 to 40 rebels were killed, the other 400 scattering. For the French, losses were three killed, five wounded, and 11 taken prisoner. This was the turning point in the uprising.

The French quickly marched reinforcements into the area under General Zucchi and when they entered the town of Gottschee on October 16 they crushed and scattered the Gottschee German rebels and restored French control. Once the French reinforcements liberated the garrison, they planned to raze Gottschee. Father Georg Jonke, a Gottschee German priest, interceded here and pleaded to the French to spare the town. Due to his actions to spare the lives of many of the French prisoners, the French listened to him and decided to plunder the town rather than burn it to the ground. From October 16 to 18, 1809, Gottschee was pillaged by the French troops. In one final act of punishment for this uprising, on October 18 the five Gottschee German leaders of the rebellion captured by the French were executed by firing squad in the churchyard of the town: Johann Jonke (from the town of Gottschee), Matthias Dulzer and Georg Eisenzopf (from Malgern), Johann Erker (from Windischdorf), and Bartholomäus Kusold (from Eben).

== Aftermath ==
Under the rule of the French, Gottschee and the rest of Carniola was incorporated into the Illyrian Provinces which was a territory under Napoleon's direct control. Even though their rebellion was destroyed and the French had increased their military presence in the area, the Gottscheers were still defiant. As it was written in the article "Gottschee und sein Volk": "Fewer and fewer soldiers of the French patrols returned home because the peasants lay in waiting for them and a good many of them were killed, In order to end this violence of the Gottscheers, the French took 200 Gottscheer citizens, placed them in back of the Stadtpfarr (parish church) and every tenth person was shot to death. In many sections of Gottschee, you can still (1947) find the mounds which are known as Franzosengräber (French graves)". Until the Gottscheers had all left their homeland following World War Two, these French graves were marks of pride for the Gottscheers. It was custom for someone to throw a stone onto a mound when he passed. In 1813, the War of the Sixth Coalition broke out and Austria invaded the Illyrian Provinces, liberating the Gottscheers from French rule and ending the Franzosenzeit (time of the French) in Gottschee. The Gottscheers remained under Austrian rule for the next 105 years, until the end of the First World War.

== Sources ==
- -Bencin, Thomas F. Gottschee: A History of a German Community on Slovenia from the Fourteenth to the Twentieth Century. Louisville, Colorado: Gottscheer Heritage and Genealogy Association, 1995. Print.
- -Kikel, "Gottschee und sein Volk," Godenkbuch, p. 29.
- -GHGA, https://web.archive.org/web/20120814171336/http://www.gottschee.org/history.html
