= Gottscheer Hall =

German bar in New York City

- Bar at the Gottscheer Hall in September 2026
- Interactive map of Gottscheer Hall

Restaurant information
- Established: December 1924
- Location: 6-57 Fairview Avenue, Ridgewood, New York, United States
- Coordinates: 40°42′25″N 73°54′20″W
- Website: https://www.gottscheerhall.com

The Gottscheer Hall is a German tavern located in the Ridgewood neighborhood of Queens in New York City.

The tavern was established in December 1924 by the Gottscheer Central Holding Corporation to serve as a community hub of Gottscheers, a community of German settlers in the Gottschee region of Slovenia who moved into Ridgewood and Williamsburg at the turn of the 20th century. The original hall burned down five years later and was later rebuilt by local Gottscheer Germans. After Gotscheers were displaced from the Slovenian enclave after the start of the World War II, many resettled in Ridgewood, which at the time hosted the largest Gottscheer community in the world. As the venue's popularity solidified, the Gottscheer Central Holding Corporation opted to acquire a bigger space, where the hall moved in 1962.

Starting in 2010s, the establishment has been gaining more traction among younger audiences, reflecting a change in the neighborhood's demographics and arrival of “twentysomething artist types” and “hipsters” in the area after being priced out of Buschwick and earlier Williamsburg. According to the venue's owners, the influx of Millennial and Gen Z patrons helped keep the business afloat amid thinning German community.
