= Battle of Caldiero (1805) order of battle =

Battle of the War of the Third Coalition

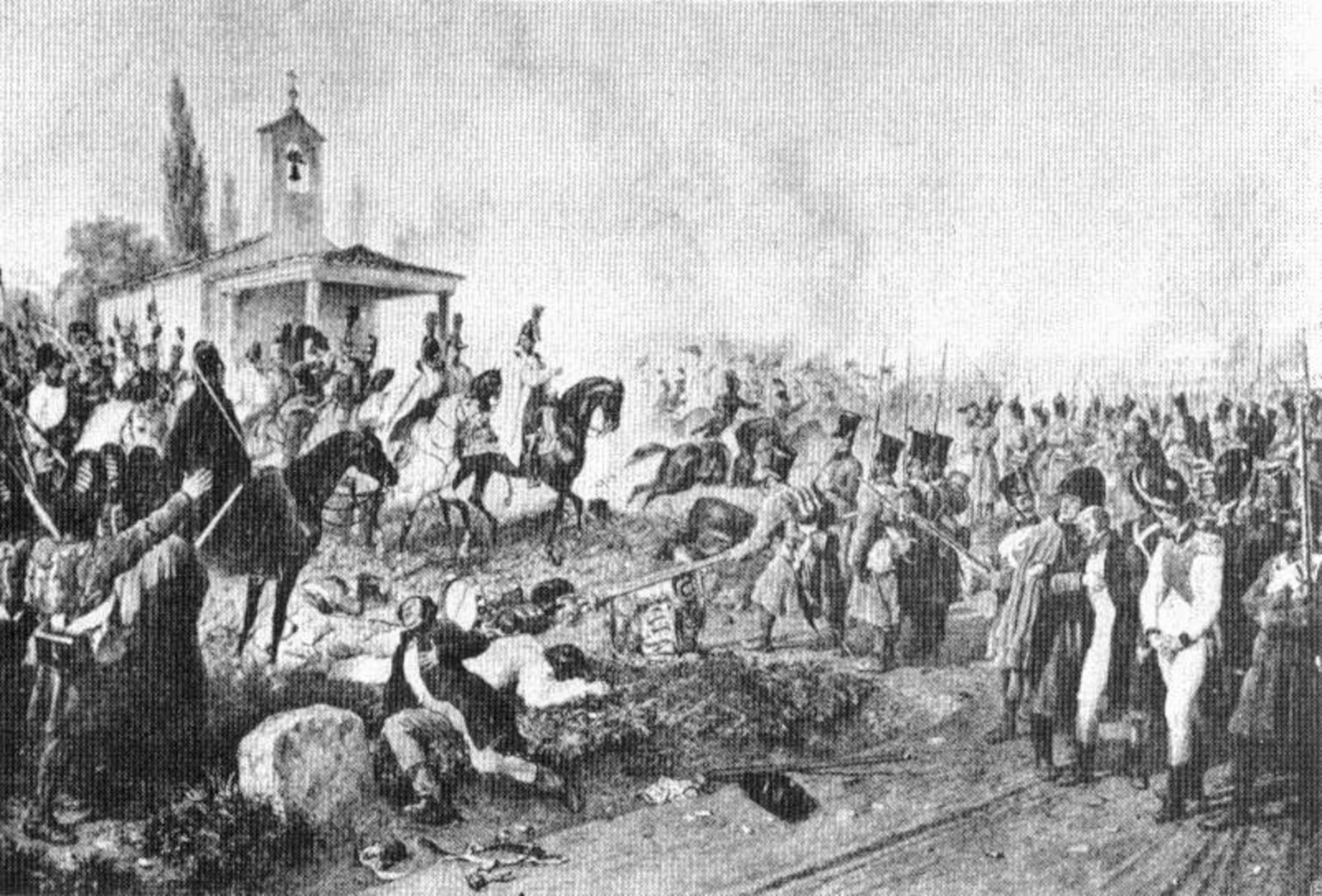
Archduke Charles at the Battle of Caldiero

The armies of the First French Empire and the Austrian Empire fought the Battle of Caldiero from 29 to 31 October 1805 just east of Verona in Italy. Marshal André Masséna led the French Army of Italy while Archduke Charles commanded the Austrian Armee von Italien. Historians variously call the battle a French victory, an Austrian victory, or indecisive. Austrian losses were over 5,500, while the French suffered at least 5,000 casualties. Archduke Charles began a withdrawal from Italy on 1 November. The retreat ended in early December with Archduke Charles's army intact at Kormend in western Hungary. Unfortunately for Austria, by this time, Emperor Napoleon had decisively defeated the Austro-Russian army at the Battle of Austerlitz.

== French order of battle ==
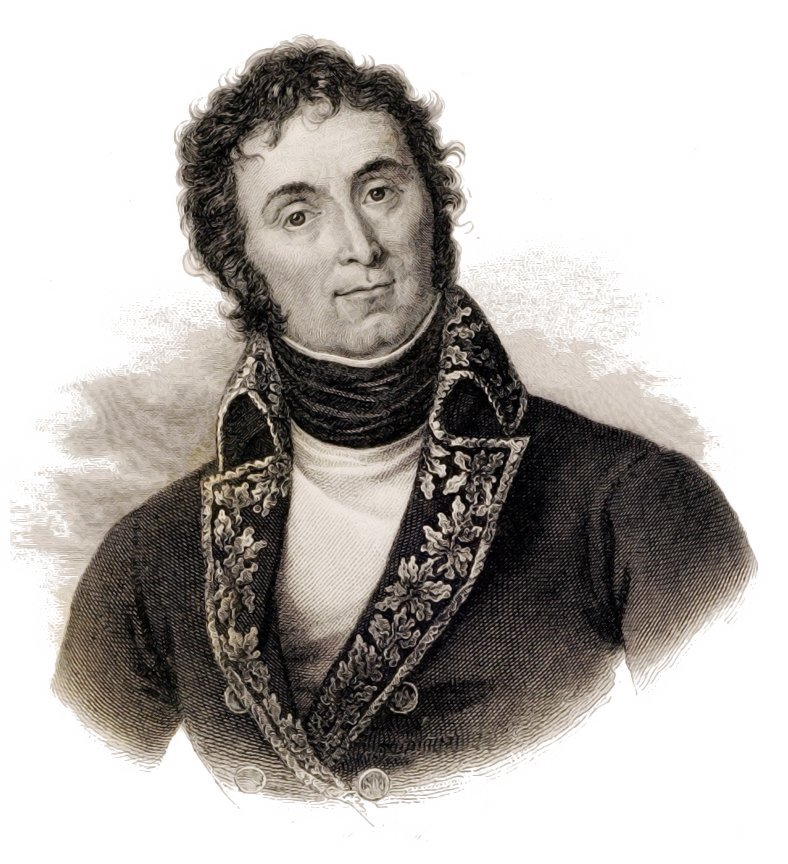
André Masséna

Army of Italy: Marshal André Masséna

=== Left Wing ===
Commander: Masséna

- Attached:
  - 2nd Italian Line Infantry Regiment (2 battalions)
  - Reine Dragoon Regiment (4 squadrons)
- 1st Division: General of Division Gaspard Amédée Gardanne
  - 1st Brigade: General of Brigade Louis Fursy Henri Compère
    - 22nd Light Infantry Regiment (3 battalions)
    - 52nd Line Infantry Regiment (3 battalions)
  - 2nd Brigade: General of Brigade Louis François Lanchatin
    - 29th Line Infantry Regiment (3 battalions)
    - 101st Line Infantry Regiment (3 battalions)
  - Attached:
    - 23rd Chasseurs à Cheval Regiment (4 squadrons)
    - 15/2nd Foot Artillery Battery

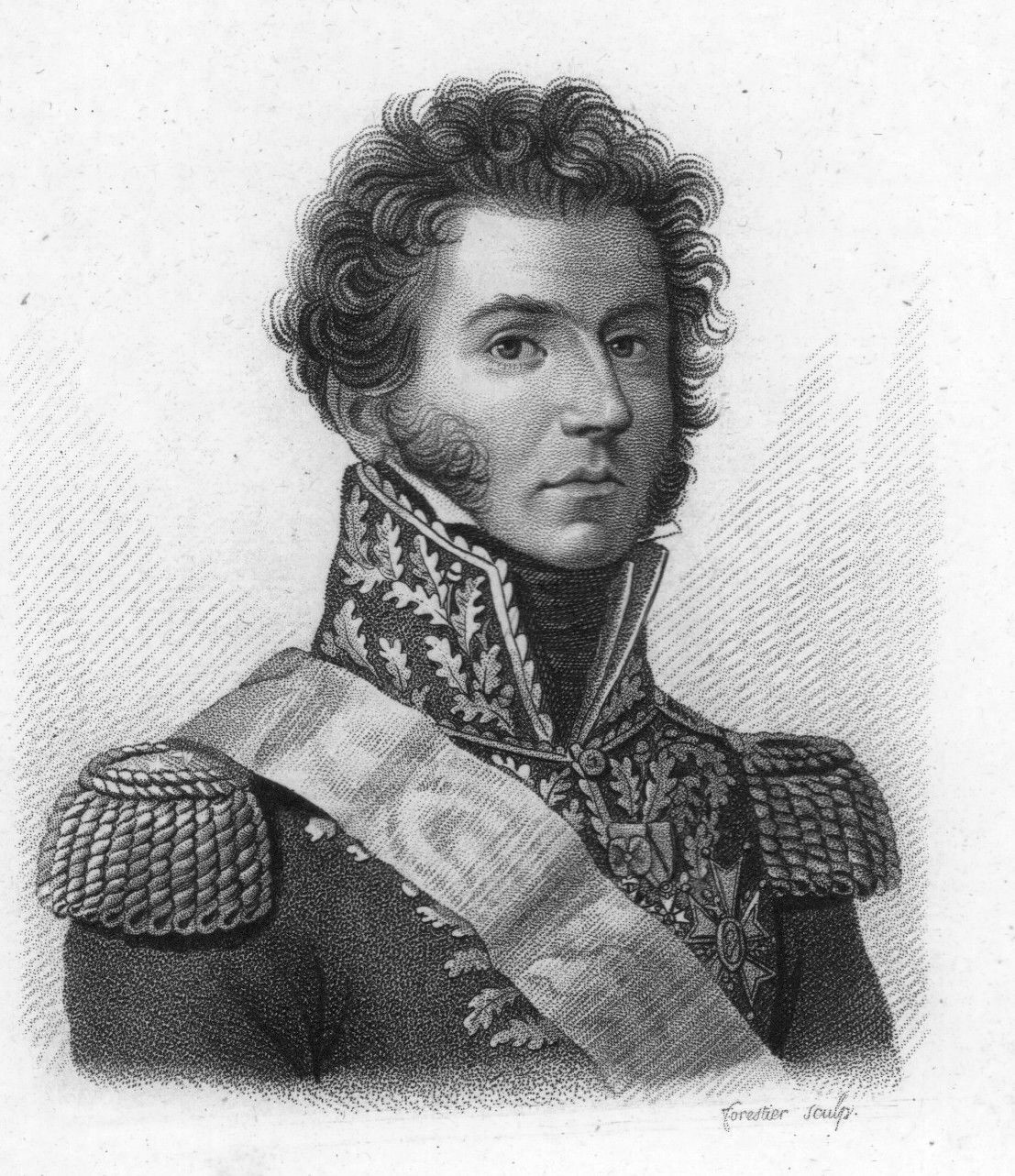
Gabriel Molitor

- 3rd Division: General of Division Gabriel Jean Joseph Molitor
  - 1st Brigade: General of Brigade Jean-Marie Auguste Aulnay de Launay
    - 23rd Line Infantry Regiment (4 battalions)
    - 79th Line Infantry Regiment (4 battalions)
  - 2nd Brigade: General of Brigade Jean-Baptiste Herbin-Dessaux
    - 5th Line Infantry Regiment (3 battalions)
  - 3rd Brigade: General of Brigade Guy Louis Henri de Valory
    - 60th Line Infantry Regiment (4 battalions)
  - Attached:
    - 29th Dragoon Regiment (4 squadrons)
    - 8/2nd Foot Artillery Battery

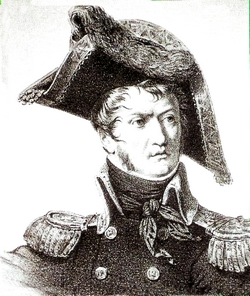
Guillaume Duhesme

- 4th Division: General of Division Guillaume Philibert Duhesme
  - 1st Brigade: General of Brigade François Goullus
    - 1st Line Infantry Regiment (3 battalions)
    - 102nd Line Infantry Regiment (3 battalions)
  - 2nd Brigade: General of Brigade Jean Le Camus
    - 14th Light Infantry Regiment (3 battalions)
    - 20th Line Infantry Regiment (4 battalions)
  - Attached:
    - 25th Chasseurs à Cheval Regiment (4 squadrons)
    - 19/2nd Foot Artillery Battery
  - 1st Brigade: General of Brigade Nicolas Bernard Guiot de Lacour
    - 24th Dragoon Regiment (4 squadrons)
    - 30th Dragoon Regiment (4 squadrons)
- Reserve Division: General of Division Louis Partouneaux
  - 1st Brigade: General of Brigade Jean-Baptiste Solignac
    - 1st Carabinier battalion
    - 2nd Grenadier battalion
    - 3rd Grenadier battalion
    - 4th Grenadier battalion
  - 2nd Brigade: General of Brigade François Valentin
    - 5th Grenadier battalion
    - 6th Grenadier battalion
    - 7th Grenadier battalion
    - 8th Grenadier battalion
  - Attached:
    - 4/4th Horse Artillery Battery
- Reserve Cavalry Division: General of Division Julien Mermet
  - 1st Brigade: Detached to 4th Division.
  - 2nd Brigade: Colonel François-Joseph d'Offenstein
    - 7th Cuirassier Regiment (4 squadrons)
    - 8th Cuirassier Regiment (4 squadrons)
  - Attached:
    - 3/1st Horse Artillery Battery
- Light Cavalry Division: General of Division Jean Louis d'Espagne
  - 1st Brigade: General of Brigade César Alexandre Debelle
    - 3rd Chasseurs à Cheval Regiment (4 squadrons)
    - 14th Chasseurs à Cheval Regiment (4 squadrons)
  - 2nd Brigade: Colonel Antoine Maurin
    - 15th Chasseurs à Cheval Regiment (4 squadrons)
    - 24th Chasseurs à Cheval Regiment (4 squadrons)
  - Attached:
    - 4/1st Horse Artillery Battery

=== Right Wing ===
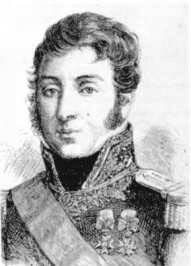
Jean-Antoine Verdier

Commander: General of Division Jean-Antoine Verdier

- 2nd Division: Verdier
  - 1st Brigade: General of Brigade Antoine Digonet
    - 23rd Light Infantry Regiment (3 battalions)
    - 10th Line Infantry Regiment (3 battalions)
  - 2nd Brigade: General of Brigade Jacques Brun
    - 56th Line Infantry Regiment (3 battalions)
    - 62nd Line Infantry Regiment (4 battalions)
  - 3rd Brigade: Colonel François Léon Ormancey
    - 4th Chasseurs à Cheval Regiment (4 squadrons)
    - 19th Chasseurs à Cheval Regiment (4 squadrons)
    - 3/4th Foot Artillery Battery
  - Attached:
    - Foot Dragoons (1 squadron)
    - 17/2nd Foot Artillery Battery
- Cavalry Division: General of Division Charles Randon de Pully
  - 1st Brigade: General of Brigade Maurice Fresia
    - 4th Cuirassier Regiment (4 squadrons)
    - 6th Cuirassier Regiment (4 squadrons)
  - 2nd Brigade: Colonel Archange Louis Rioult-Davenay
    - 23rd Dragoon Regiment (4 squadrons detached)
    - 29th Dragoon Regiment (detached to 3rd Division)

=== North of Verona ===
Commander: General of Division Jean-Mathieu Seras (not engaged)

- 5th Division: Seras
  - 1st Brigade: General of Brigade Jacques Laurent Gilly
    - Légion Corse (1 battalion)
    - 8th Light Infantry Regiment (2 battalions)
    - 53rd Line Infantry Regiment (3 battalions)
  - 2nd Brigade: General of Brigade Pierre-Joseph Guillet
    - 81st Line Infantry Regiment (3 battalions)
    - 106th Line Infantry Regiment (3 battalions)
  - 3rd Brigade: General of Brigade Claude François de Malet
    - 13th Line Infantry Regiment (3 battalions)
  - 4th Brigade: General of Brigade Jean Jacques Schilt
    - 9th Line Infantry Regiment (2 battalions)
  - Artillery: Italian Foot Artillery Battery

== Austrian Army order of battle ==
A few months before the outbreak of war, Austrian infantry regiments were reorganized into four line battalions and one grenadier battalion. Each battalion consisted of four companies each of 160 musketeers.

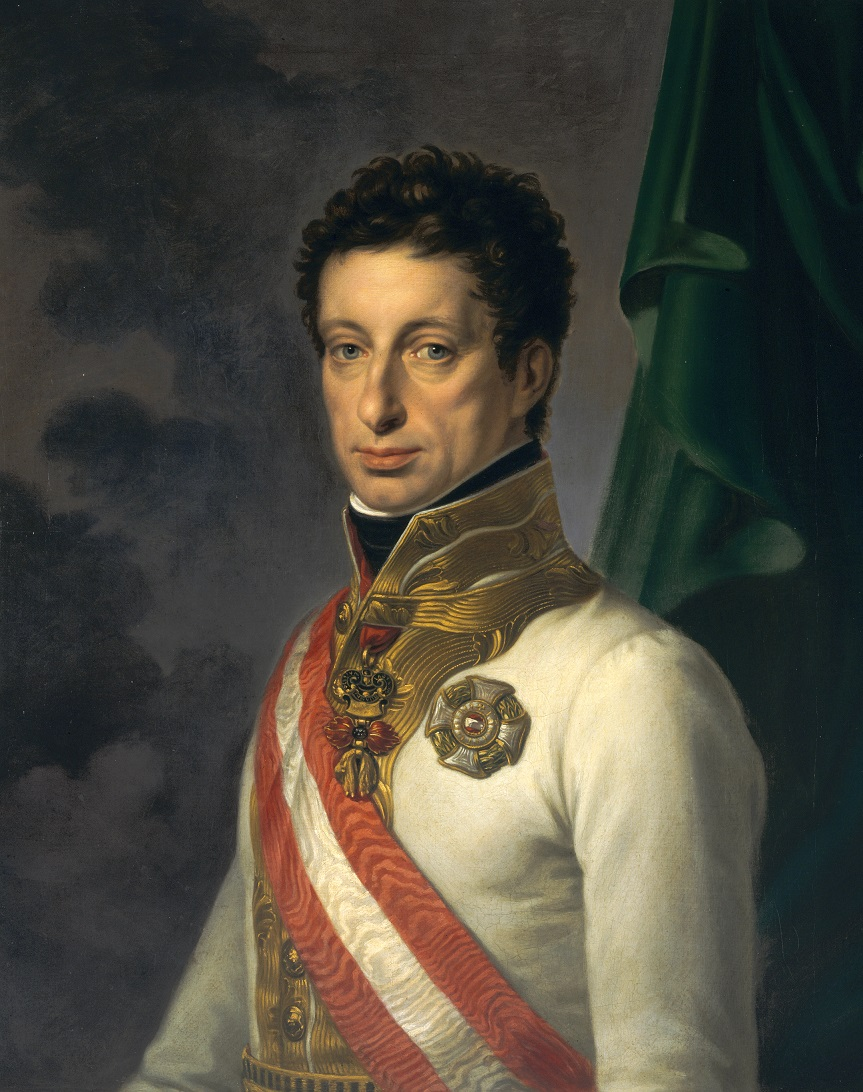
Archduke Charles

Armee von Italien: Feldmarschall Archduke Charles

=== Right Wing ===
Commander: Feldmarschall-Leutnant Joseph Anton von Simbschen

- Division Simbschen
  - Brigade: General-Major Johann Maria Philipp Frimont
    - St. Georges Grenz Infantry Regiment Nr. 6 (3 battalions)
    - Ferdinand Hussar Regiment Nr. 3 (4 squadrons)
  - Brigade: Friedrich Kottunlinsky
    - Schröder Infantry Regiment Nr. 7 (4 battalions)
    - Lindenau Infantry Regiment Nr. 29 (4 battalions)
  - Brigade: Stephan Mihaljevich
    - Splenyi Infantry Regiment Nr. 51 (4 battalions)
  - Brigade: Karl Soudain von Niederwerth
    - Coburg Infantry Regiment Nr. 22 (4 battalions)
    - Hohenlohe-Bartenstein Infantry Regiment Nr. 26 (4 battalions)

=== Center ===
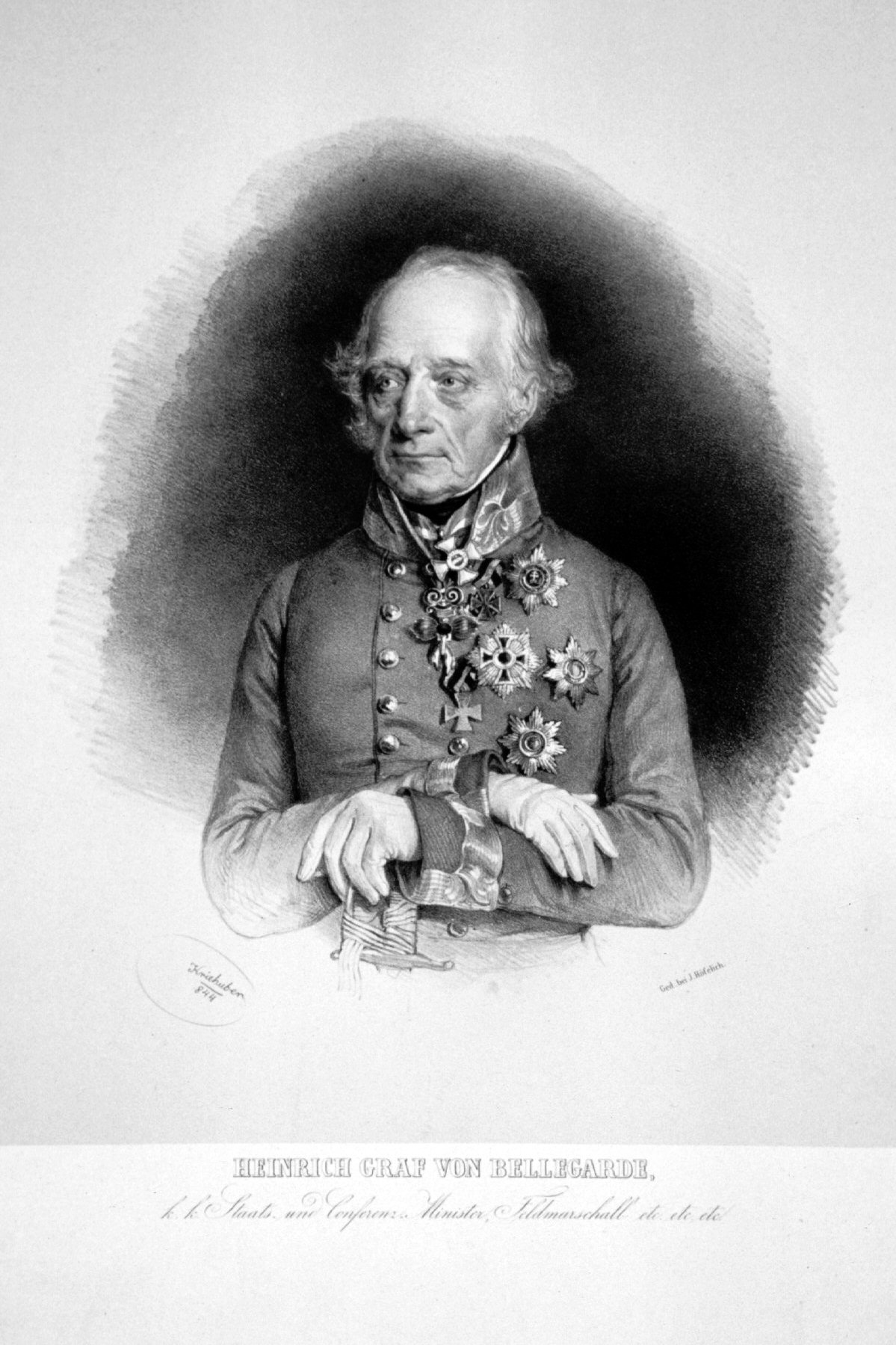
Heinrich von Bellegarde

Commander: General der Kavallerie Count Heinrich von Bellegarde

- Division (1st Line): Feldmarschall-Leutnant Ludwig von Vogelsang
  - Brigade: General-Major Joseph Wetzel
    - Archduke Ferdinand Infantry Regiment Nr. 2 (4 battalions)
    - Franz Jellacic Infantry Regiment Nr. 62 (4 battalions)
  - Brigade: General-Major Georg Croll von Herzberg
    - Grenadier battalion Bellegarde Nr. 44
    - Grenadier battalion Reisky Nr. 13
    - Grenadier battalion Lattermann Nr. 45
    - Grenadier battalion Schröder Nr. 7
    - Grenadier battalion Archduke Rudolf Nr. 16
    - Grenadier battalion Archduke Josef Nr. 63
    - Grenadier battalion Wenzel Colloredo Nr. 56
- Cavalry Division: Feldmarschall-Leutnant Andreas O'Reilly von Ballinlough
  - Kaiser Chevau-léger Regiment Nr. 1 (8 squadrons)
  - Kienmayer Hussar Regiment Nr. 8 (8 squadrons)
- Division (2nd Line): Feldmarschall-Leutnant Karl Friedrich von Lindenau
  - Brigade: General-Major Guido Lippa von Duba
    - Grenadier battalion Coburg Nr. 22
    - Grenadier battalion Hohenlohe Nr. 26
    - Grenadier battalion Strassoldo Nr. 27
    - Grenadier battalion Lindenau Nr. 29
  - Brigade: General-Major Prince Ludwig of Hohenlohe-Bartenstein
    - Grenadier battalion Archduke Ferdinand Nr. 2
    - Grenadier battalion Sztarray Nr. 33
    - Grenadier battalion Davidovich Nr. 34
    - Grenadier battalion Auffenberg Nr. 37
    - Grenadier battalion Franz Jellacic Nr. 62
  - Brigade: unknown
    - Esterhazy Infantry Regiment Nr. 34 (4 battalions)
- Cavalry Division: Feldmarschall-Leutnant Joseph Louis, Prince of Lorraine-Vaudémont
  - Levenehr Dragoon Regiment Nr. 4 (8 squadrons)
  - Savoy Dragoon Regiment Nr. 5 (8 squadrons)

=== Left Wing ===
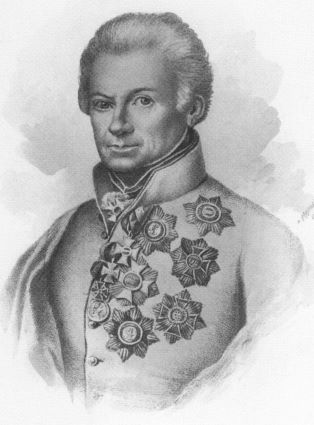
Prince Reuss-Plauen

Commander: Feldmarschall-Leutnant Prince Heinrich XV of Reuss-Plauen

- Division: Reuss
  - Brigade: General-Major Johann Kalnássy
    - Vukassovich Infantry Regiment Nr. 48 (4 battalions)
    - Archduke Franz Carl Infantry Regiment Nr. 52 (4 battalions)
  - Brigade: General-Major Hieronymus Karl Graf von Colloredo-Mansfeld
    - Grenadier battalion Esterhazy Nr. 34
    - Grenadier battalion Vukassovich Nr. 48
    - Grenadier battalion Splenyi Nr. 51
    - Grenadier battalion Saint-Julien Nr. 61
    - Grenadier battalion Archduke Franz Carl Nr. 52
  - Attached Cavalry:
    - Archduke Charles Uhlan Regiment Nr. 3 (8 squadrons)

=== Far Left Wing ===
Commander: General-Major Armand von Nordmann

- Division: Nordmann
  - Brigade: General-Major Franz Anthony von Siegenfeld
    - Kreutzer Grenz Infantry Regiment Nr. 5 (3 battalions)
    - Gradiscaner Grenz Infantry Regiment Nr. 8 (1 battalion)
  - Brigade: Nordmann
    - Gradiscaner Grenz Infantry Regiment Nr. 8 (2 battalions)
    - Grenadier battalion Anspach Nr. 10
    - Erdödy Hussar Regiment Nr. 9 (8 squadrons)

=== Reserve ===
Commander: Feldmarschall-Leutnant Eugène-Guillaume Argenteau

- Brigade: General-Major Alois von Gavasini
  - Archduke Rudolf Infantry Regiment Nr. 16 (4 battalions)
  - Lattermann Infantry Regiment Nr. 45 (3 battalions)
  - Stipczic Hussar Regiment Nr. 10 (8 squadrons)

=== Detached Corps ===
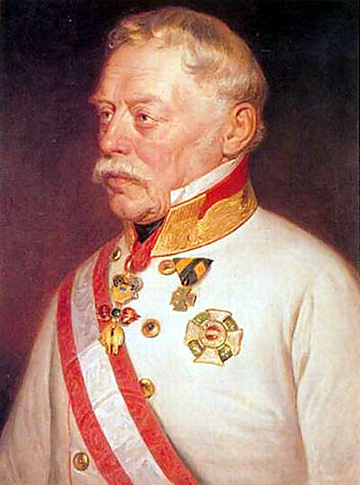
Joseph Radetzky

Commander: Feldmarschall-Leutnant Paul Davidovich (not engaged)

- Division: Feldmarschall-Leutnant Prince Franz Seraph of Rosenberg-Orsini
  - Brigade: General-Major Joseph Radetzky von Radetz
    - Szluiner Grenz Infantry Regiment Nr. 4 (3 battalions)
    - Ott Hussars Nr. 5 (8 squadrons)
  - Brigade: General-Major Peter Knesevich
    - Reiski Infantry Regiment Nr. 13 (4 battalions)
    - Archduke Joseph Infantry Regiment Nr. 63 (4 battalions)
    - Archduke Joseph Hussar Regiment Nr. 2 (6 squadrons)
- Division: General-Major Wunibald Löwenberg
  - Brigade: Löwenberg
    - 1st Banat Grenz Infantry Regiment Nr. 10 (3 battalions)
    - Archduke Joseph Hussar Regiment Nr. 2 (2 squadrons)

=== Detached Division ===
Commander: Feldmarschall-Leutnant Josef Philipp Vukassovich (replaced by Rosenberg) (not engaged)

- Division: Rosenberg vice Vukassovich
  - Brigade: General-Major Hannibal Sommariva
    - Licaner Grenz Infantry Regiment Nr. 1 (3 battalions)
    - Ottocaner Grenz Infantry Regiment Nr. 2 (1 battalion)
    - 2nd Banat Grenz Infantry Regiment Nr. 11 (3 battalions)
    - Archduke Ferdinand Hussar Regiment Nr. 3 (4 squadrons)
  - Brigade: General-Major Karl Hillinger
    - Davidovich Infantry Regiment Nr. 34 (4 battalions)
    - Auffenberg Infantry Regiment Nr. 37 (3 battalions)
