= Compere =

Compere or Compère may refer to:

== French surname ==
- Loyset Compère (c. 1445–1518), French composer of the Renaissance
- Claude Antoine Compère (1774–1812), French general in the French Revolutionary Wars and the Napoleonic Wars
- Louis Fursy Henri Compère (1768–1833), French general in the French Revolutionary Wars and the Napoleonic Wars
- René Compère (1906–1969), Belgian jazz trumpeter
- Adéodat Compère-Morel (1872–1941), French Socialist politician and agronomist
- Léon Compère-Léandre (c. 1874–1936), Martiniquais shoemaker, survivor of the Mount Pelée eruption in 1902

== Other uses ==
- Compere (host), a master of ceremonies
- Les Compères, a 1983 French comedy film
