= Andreas O'Reilly von Ballinlough =

Irish-Austrian cavalry general (1742–1832)

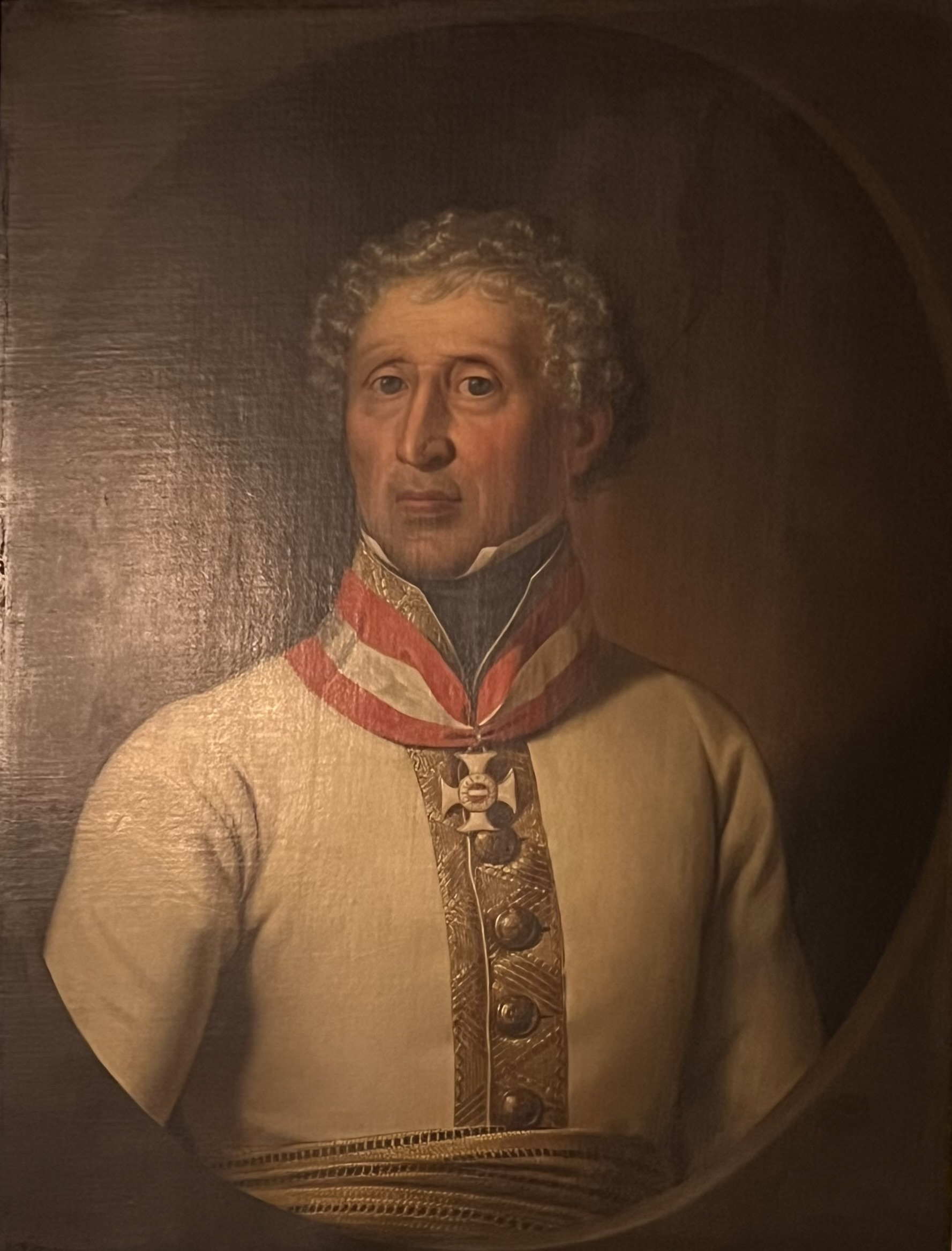
- Born: Andrew O'Reilly; 3 August 1742; Ballinlough, County Westmeath, Ireland
- Died: 5 July 1832 (aged 89); Vienna, Austria
- Military career
- Allegiance: Habsburg monarchy Austrian Empire
- Service years: 1756–1810
- Rank: General der Kavallerie
- Conflicts: Seven Years' War, War of the Bavarian Succession, Austro-Turkish War (1787–1791), French Revolutionary Wars, Napoleonic Wars
- Awards: Military Order of Maria Theresa (Commander's Cross)
- Other work: Inhaber, Chevauxleger Regt. N°3; Imperial-Royal Chamberlain

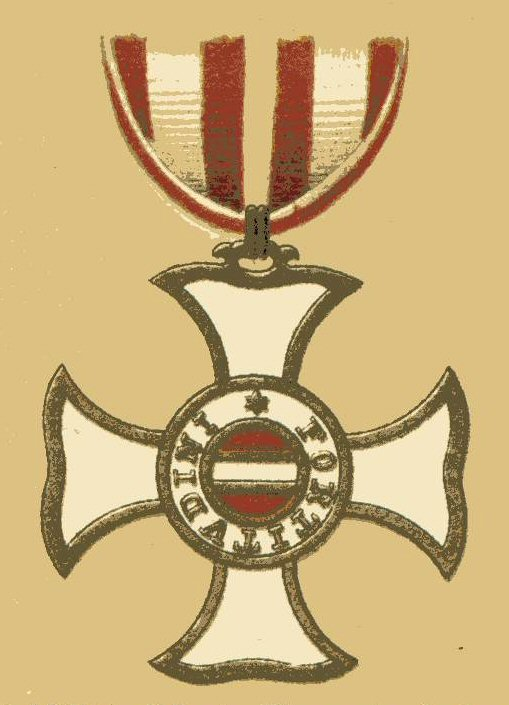
The Military Order of Maria Theresa, which O'Reilly earned in 1801

Andreas Graf O'Reilly von Ballinlough (3 August 1742 – 5 July 1832) was an Irish-Austrian soldier and military commander. His military service extended through the Seven Years' War, War of the Bavarian Succession, Austro-Turkish War, French Revolutionary Wars, and Napoleonic Wars. He retired from the army in 1810 and died at age 89.

Andrew O'Reilly was born in Ballinlough, County Westmeath, Ireland. His brother, Hugh, was created baronet of Ballinlough in 1795, and in 1812, on the death of their maternal uncle John Nugent, he assumed by Royal licence the surname of Nugent (see Nugent Baronets). Their sister Margaret married Richard Talbot and was, as a widow, created Baroness Talbot of Malahide in 1831.

At the age of 14, Andrew O'Reilly joined the army of Habsburg Austria and fought against the Kingdom of Prussia. After rising in the army, he married into an aristocratic family in his 40s. He led a cavalry regiment in combat against the Ottoman Turks. In the war with the French First Republic he was promoted to general officer. He played a leading role in the Battle of Marengo in 1800, where he led one of the Austrian attack columns. Even in his 60s he remained a military officer, fighting against the First French Empire in 1805 and was compelled to surrender Vienna in 1809. From 1803 until his death in 1832, he was Proprietor (Inhaber) of an Austrian light cavalry regiment.

== Early career ==
He joined the army of Habsburg Austria as a volunteer in 1756 and fought in the Seven Years' War. In the War of the Bavarian Succession, he achieved promotion to the rank of Major. In 1784 he wed Barbara Gräfin von Sweerts und Sporck (1760–1834) from a Bohemian noble family. That year he also rose in rank to Oberstleutnant. In 1787 he was ennobled, becoming Andreas Graf O'Reilly von Ballinlough. In 1790 during the war against Turkey he was elevated to Oberst and took command of the Modena Chevau-léger Regiment #13, which he led at the Siege of Belgrade in late 1789.

== French Revolutionary Wars ==
O'Reilly was promoted to General-Major during the War of the First Coalition in 1794. He achieved distinction at the Battle of Amberg on 24 August 1796. At the First Battle of Zürich on 4 June 1799, he led a brigade in Friedrich Freiherr von Hotze's Left Wing. His command consisted of one battalion of the Peterwardeiner Grenz Infantry Regiment #9, three battalions of the Kaunitz Infantry Regiment #20, two squadrons of the Coburg Dragoon Regiment #6, and two squadrons of Grenz Hussars. He transferred to the army of Michael von Melas in Italy and received promotion to Feldmarschallleutnant on 6 March 1800.

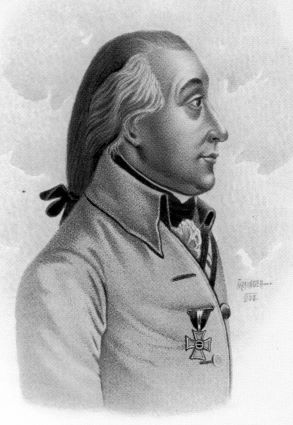
Peter Karl Ott von Bátorkéz, who ordered O'Reilly to defend Casteggio.

Napoleon Bonaparte invaded Italy across the Great St Bernard Pass in May 1800 and seized Milan on 2 June. Reacting to the surprise French offensive, Melas ordered O'Reilly to take 3,000 troops and an artillery convoy to defend Piacenza. The Austrian army commander hoped to use Piacenza as a base to launch a counterattack against Milan. In the event, Piacenza fell to the French before O'Reilly reached it. On 6 June, after an 11-hour skirmish, he successfully managed to save the artillery convoy and withdraw to the west, while fending off a French column that tried to cut him off.

At the Battle of Montebello on 9 June, Peter Karl Ott von Bátorkéz ordered O'Reilly to hold the village of Casteggio with six battalions and four squadrons. When Jean Lannes advanced that morning, Ott was under instructions to avoid a battle. Yet, when he saw O'Reilly's men come under attack, Ott ignored army Chief of staff Anton von Zach's advice and committed his corps to battle. O'Reilly defended Casteggio stubbornly as the French persisted in their attacks for hours. Reinforced by Claude Perrin Victor, the French finally gained the upper hand and Ott called on O'Reilly to cover the retreat.

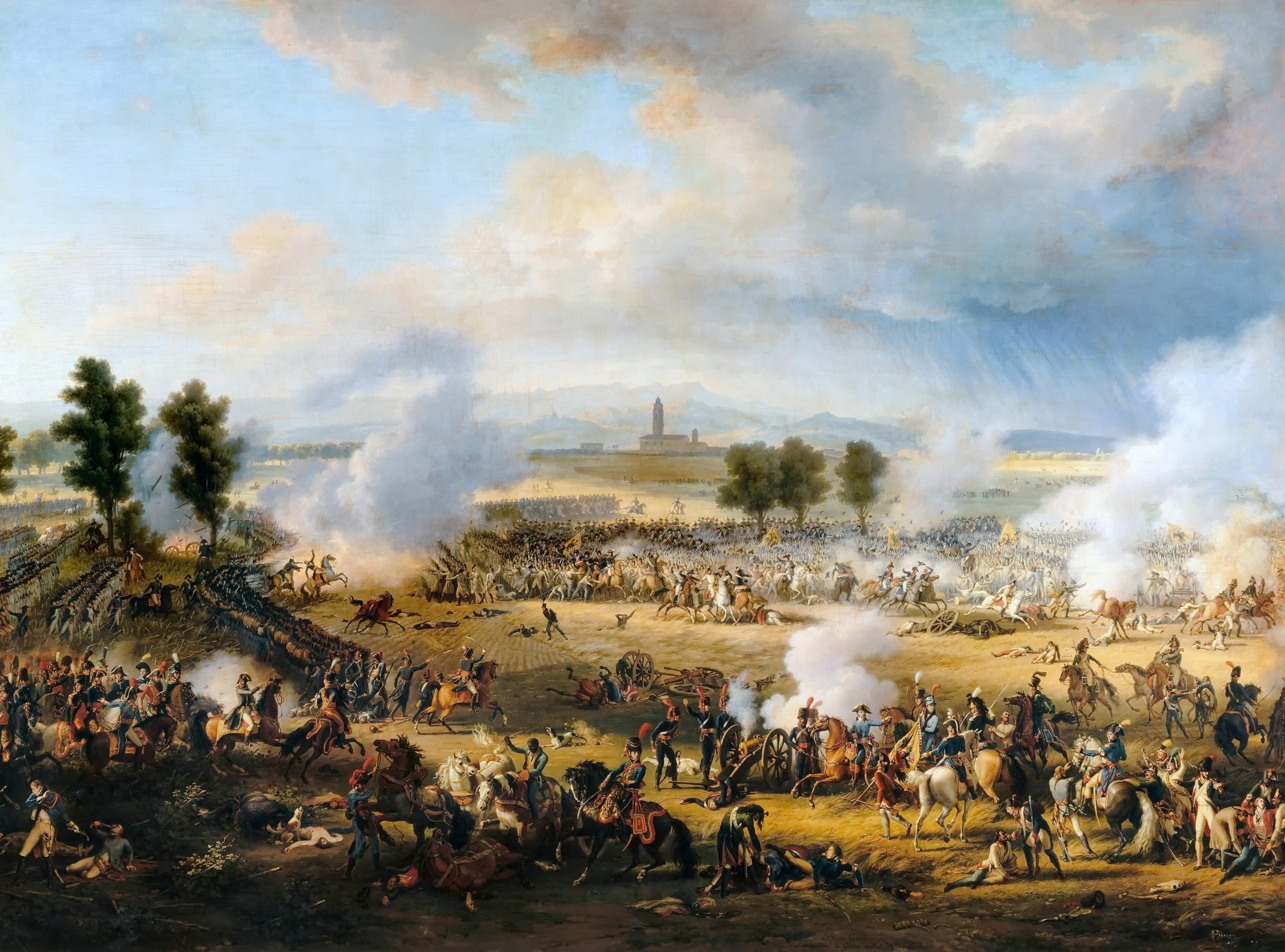
The Battle of Marengo by Louis-François Lejeune. O'Reilly was preoccupied with a small French detachment when the crisis of the Battle of Marengo occurred.

On 14 June at the Battle of Marengo Melas gave O'Reilly command of the 3,000-strong Right Column. The units under his leadership included single battalions of the Banater #4, Warasdiner-Kreutzer #5, Oguliner #3, and Ottocaner #2 Grenz Infantry Regiments, plus one company of Mariassy Jägers. He also led detachments from three cavalry regiments, three squadrons of Nauendorf Hussars #8, two squadrons of Hussars #5, and one squadron of Württemberg Dragoons #8. On the afternoon of the 13th, O'Reilly held Marengo village, which Melas intended to hold in preparation for his planned offensive the next day. In contrast to his stout defense of Casteggio, O'Reilly's performance was weak and Victor captured Marengo after only an hour of fighting. The loss of the village meant that the Austrian army had to fight over the same ground the next day.

On the morning of the 14th, the Advance Guard under Johann Maria Philipp Frimont and O'Reilly's Right Column soon found Gaspard Amédée Gardanne's French division blocking their path. Gardanne's men, deployed on a narrow front, blunted the Austrian advance for 90 minutes and forced Melas to commit large forces to the attack. While the rest of the army hammered at the main French battle line near Marengo, O'Reilly became preoccupied with Achille Dampierre's 300 to 400 Frenchmen who occupied Stortigliona Farm on the south flank. When the outnumbered defenders withdrew to the south, O'Reilly, displaying "no initiative whatsoever" followed Dampierre. Ignoring the now-exposed French left flank, the Austrian Right Column hunted down Dampierre's force at Cassina Bianca. Dampierre finally surrendered to the Oguliner Grenz at 7:00 pm that evening after losing two-thirds of his men as casualties. But, the small French detachment tied up a significant part of O'Reilly's column during the day Nevertheless, he earned the Knight's Cross of the Military Order of Maria Theresa on 18 August 1801.

Meanwhile, Melas finally cracked the French line near Marengo and organized a pursuit column. At about 3:00 pm, Konrad Valentin von Kaim's center column lurched into motion, with Ott's Left Column to the north and elements of O'Reilly and Frimont's forces to the south. Late-arriving French reinforcements routed Kaim's center column around 5:00 pm. In the stampede that followed, O'Reilly was able to retreat to the bridgehead successfully and covered the withdrawal of Ott's column that evening.

== Napoleonic Wars ==
In 1803, he became Inhaber of the O'Reilly Chevau-léger Regiment #3 and held this position during his lifetime. The regiment became noted for its outstanding combat efficiency during the 1809 war.

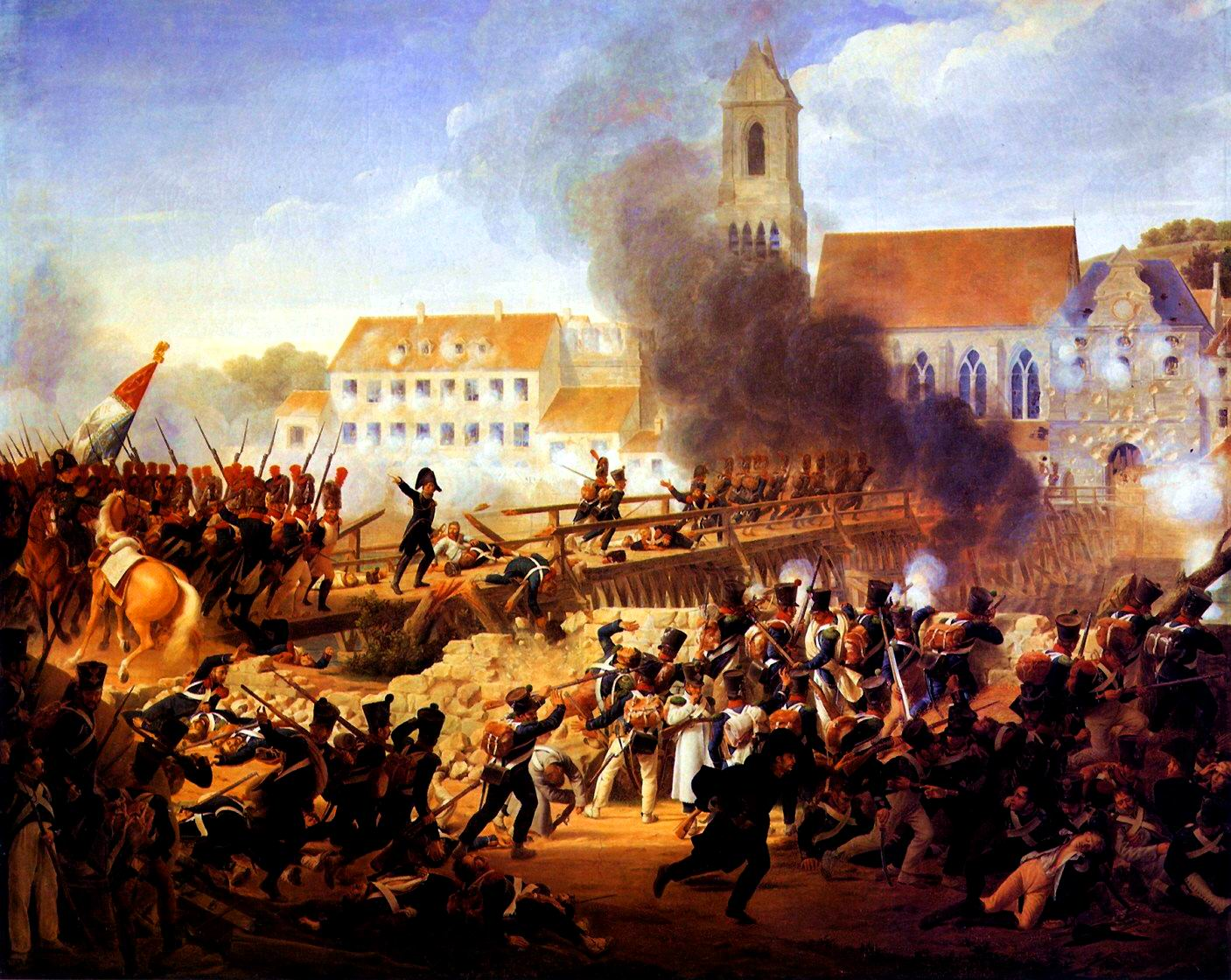
Austrian defeat at the Battle of Landshut left Vienna exposed to French capture

At the beginning of the War of the Third Coalition, O'Reilly led a cavalry division in the Armee von Italien of Archduke Charles, Duke of Teschen. Under his command were the Kaiser Chevau-léger Regiment #1 and Kienmayer Hussar Regiment #8, a total of 16 squadrons. In the Battle of Verona (1805) on 18 October 1805, Count Heinrich von Bellegarde led his corps to support Josef Philipp Vukassovich, whose division was under attack by the French. O'Reilly's division was only lightly engaged before darkness ended the fighting. At the Battle of Caldiero on 30 October, O'Reilly's division participated in the counterattacks which helped restore the Austrian line. For his actions in the war, he earned the Commander's Cross of the Military Order of Maria Theresa on 28 May 1806.

In the War of the Fifth Coalition, Emperor Napoleon I of France defeated Johann von Hiller at the Battle of Landshut on 21 April 1809 and Archduke Charles at the Battle of Eckmühl on 22 April. These defeats left Hiller's outnumbered force isolated on the south bank of the Danube. Hiller's retreat left Vienna exposed to French capture. Accordingly, Archduke Maximilian of Austria-Este was given the task of garrisoning Vienna with the 35,000 available troops. O'Reilly commanded 14 battalions of second-class Austrian and Bohemian landwehr plus 6,000 armed citizens. Other forces included a brigade of five elite grenadier battalions under Michael von Kienmayer; Joseph Dedovich's division of eight regular, six landwehr, and six volunteer battalions; and four battalions and five squadrons under Armand von Nordmann and Joseph, Baron von Mesko de Felsö-Kubiny. After a bombardment, the inexperienced Maximilian decided to abandon the capital and ordered O'Reilly to surrender with a token garrison. The archduke mismanaged the evacuation and O'Reilly capitulated on 13 May with 2,000 troops, including 13 generals, 17 staff officers, 163 officers. Even worse, the French recovered 100 pieces of artillery and a military chest with 4.5 million florins.

O'Reilly left the army on 7 January 1810, being promoted to General der Kavallerie upon retirement. He died at Vienna on 5 July 1832, only one month shy of his 90th birthday.

== See also ==
- Irish military diaspora
- Irish regiments

== Notes ==
Military offices
Preceded by Joseph Maria Karl Fürst von Lobkowitz	Proprietor (Inhaber) of Chevauxleger Regiment #3; 1803–1832	Succeeded by Unknown
