= Louis Fursy Henri Compère =

French general

- Born: 16 January 1768; Péronne, Somme
- Died: 27 March 1833 (aged 65)
- Allegiance: France
- Branch: Artillery
- Rank: General of Division
- Conflicts: French Revolutionary Wars; Napoleonic Wars
- Awards: Légion d'Honneur

Louis Fursy Henri Compère (16 January 1768 – 27 March 1833) was a French general of artillery in the French Revolutionary Wars and the Napoleonic Wars.

Compère was born in Péronne, Somme. In 1794, he was promoted to chef de brigade, the equivalent of colonel. On 1 May 1794, he was promoted to general of brigade. He was part of the Army of the Danube crossing into the southwest German states in 1799, and participated in the Battle of Ostrach and the Battle of Stockach. He was the brother of the General Claude Antoine Compère (1774–1812).

== Career ==
He fought at the Battle of Verona on 18 October 1805 where his brigade of Gaspard Amédée Gardanne's division supported the initial attack of André Masséna's converged voltiguers. Later his soldiers formed squares to drive off a counterattack by Austrian hussars. He also led his troops at the Battle of Caldiero on 29 to 31 October in the same year. He commanded one of Jean Reynier's brigades at the Battle of Maida on 4 July 1806. He personally led the 1st Light Infantry Regiment in an attack against the British. Hit by a bullet, he continued to urge his troops forward and rode literally among British troops, who captured him. He was promoted to general of division on 1 March 1807. Napoleon awarded him the Commander's Cross of the Legion of Honor.
