= Louis Partouneaux =

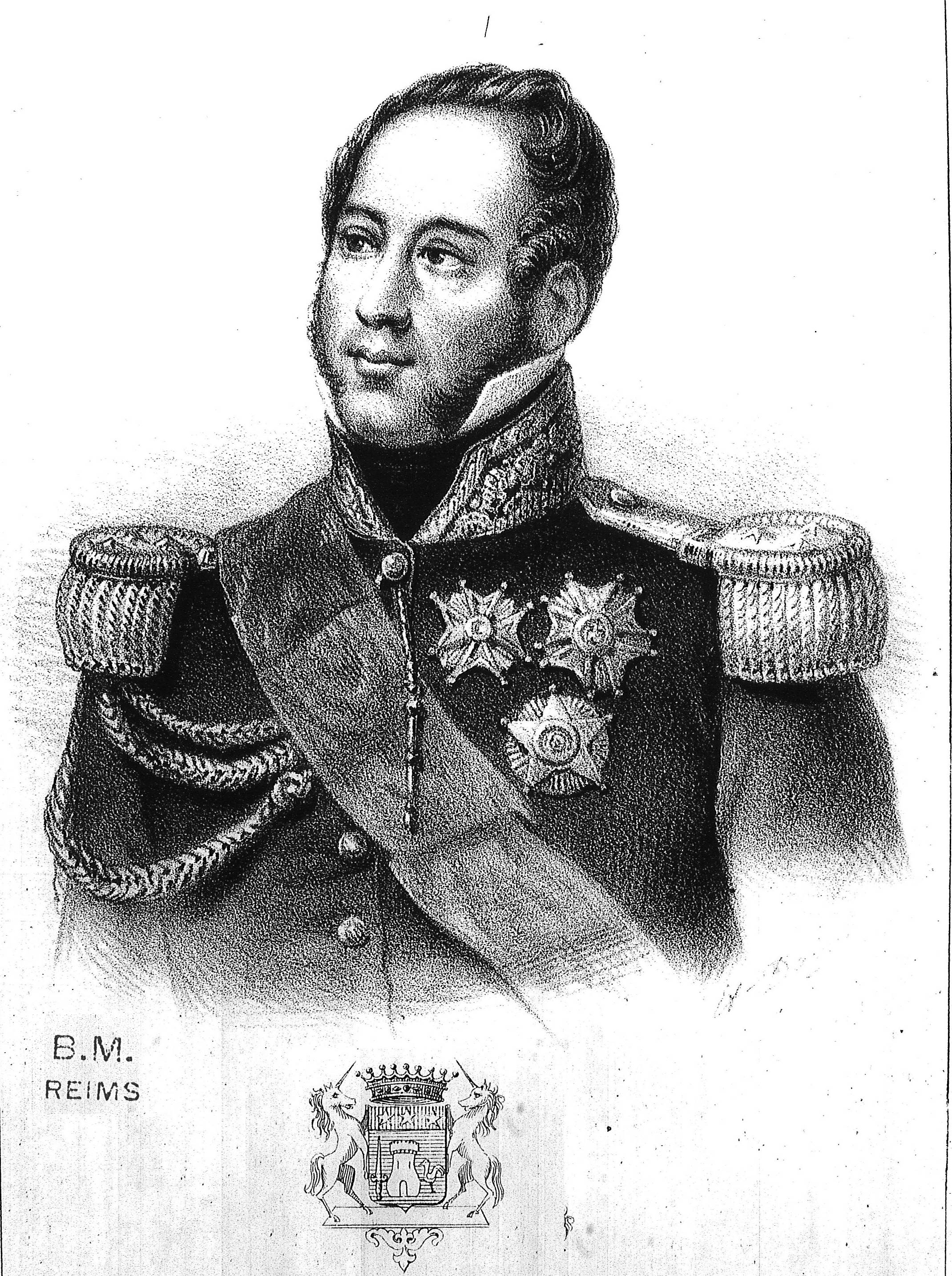
- General of Division Louis Partouneaux
- Born: 26 September 1770; Romilly-sur-Seine, France
- Died: 14 January 1835 (aged 64); Menton, Monaco, in present-day Alpes-Maritimes, France
- Military career
- Allegiance: France
- Branch: Infantry
- Service years: 1791–1832
- Rank: General of Division
- Conflicts: War of the First Coalition; Siege of Toulon; Battle of Rivoli; Tyrol Campaign; War of the Second Coalition; Battle of Verona; Battle of Magnano; Battle of Novi; War of the Third Coalition; Battle of Caldiero; Invasion of Naples; War of the Sixth Coalition; Battle of Berezina
- Awards: Légion d'Honneur, CC, 1804
- Other work: Chamber of Deputies, 1824

Louis Partouneaux (French pronunciation: [lwi paʁtuno]; 26 September 1770 – 14 January 1835) led an infantry division during the First French Empire of Napoleon. He joined the army of the French First Republic in 1791 and fought the Sardinians. He served at Toulon in 1793 and at Rivoli and Salorno in 1797. He fought at Verona and Magnano in 1799 and received promotion to general officer. At Novi later that year he was wounded and captured.

Promoted again, he commanded a division at Caldiero in 1805 and in Naples in 1806. At the Berezina in 1812 his division was surrounded by Platov's Cossack Vanguard, when he tried to rescue his division by marching to the bridgehead over the Berezina, he stumbled upon Wittgenstein's Army, and then the division was wiped off, while he got captured. After the Napoleonic Wars he was elected to the Chamber of Deputies in 1824. He held various posts until his retirement in 1832 and died of a stroke in 1835. Partouneaux is one of the names inscribed under the Arc de Triomphe on Column 26.

== Career ==
He was a brigadier in Joseph Hélie Désiré Perruquet de Montrichard's division at the Battle of Magnano on 5 April 1799. His command included 1,000 French soldiers of the 3rd Line Demi-Brigade and 800 men of the 1st Battalion of the 2nd Polish Legion. The other brigadier in the division was Gaspard Amédée Gardanne. At 5:00 PM the village of Dossobuono was captured. Later that evening the Austrians launched a powerful counterattack which recaptured Dossobuono despite strong resistance by Partouneaux's brigade.

In 1812, Partouneaux was appointed commander of the 12th Division, which was part of Marshal Claude Perrin Victor's IX Corps. The 1st Brigade consisted of the 10th and 29th Line Infantry Regiments, the 2nd Brigade included the 125th Line and a Provisional Line Infantry Regiment, while the 3rd Brigade had the 44th and 126th Line Infantry Regiments. The provisional regiment was formed from individual battalions of the 36th, 51st, and 55th Line.
