= Claude Antoine Compère =

French general (1774–1812)

- Born: 21 May 1774; Chalons-sur-Marne
- Died: 7 September 1812 (aged 38) Borodino
- Allegiance: (France) French First Republic (France) First French Empire; Kingdom of Naples
- Branch: Infantry
- Service years: 1792-1812
- Rank: (France) General of Brigade; Lieutenant General
- Conflicts: French Revolutionary Wars; Napoleonic Wars
- Awards: Legion of Honour; Royal Order of the Two-Sicilies

Claude Antoine Compère (French pronunciation: [klod ɑ̃twan kɔ̃pɛʁ]; 21 May 1774 – 7 September 1812) was a French army officer and later general who served during the French Revolutionary and Napoleonic Wars. He was killed at the Battle of Borodino. He was the younger brother of General Louis Fursy Henri Compère.
