= Guillaume Philibert Duhesme =

French Army officer

Guillaume Philibert Duhesme Count of the Empire, Peer of France
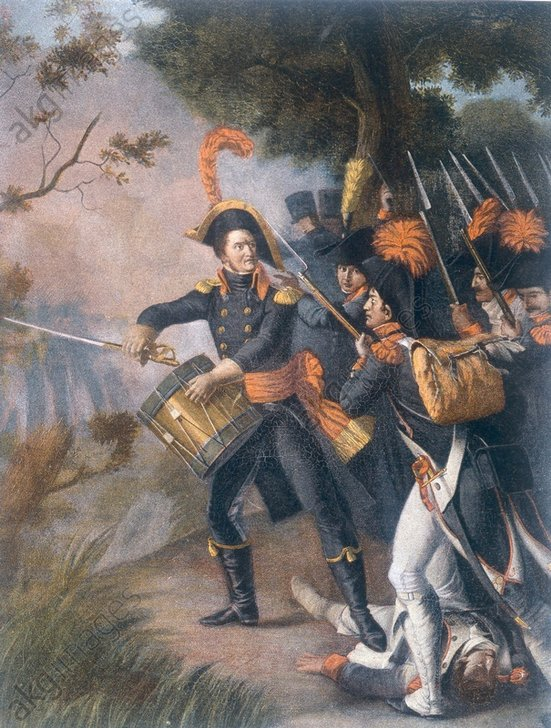
- General Duhesme at the Battle of Diersheim, by Charles Thévenin
- Born: 7 July 1766; Mercurey, France
- Died: 20 June 1815; Waterloo
- Burial place: Duhesme Mausoleum
- Military career
- Allegiance: Kingdom of France; Kingdom of the French; French First Republic; First French Empire
- Branch: French Army
- Service years: 1791–1815
- Rank: Division general
- Nickname: Le Général Baïonnette
- Conflicts: War of the First Coalition; War of the Second Coalition; War of the Third Coalition; War of the Fourth Coalition; Peninsular War; War of the Sixth Coalition; Hundred Days †
- Awards: Legion of Honour; Order of Saint Louis; Order of the Iron Crown

Signature
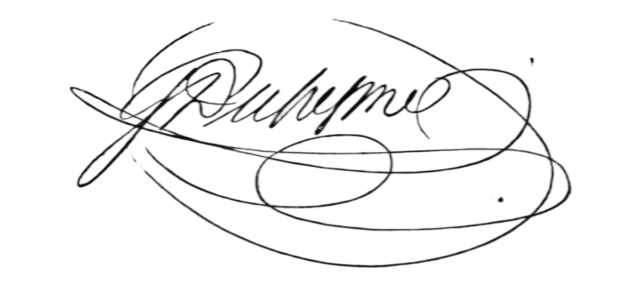

Guillaume Philibert, 1st Count Duhesme (French pronunciation: [ɡijom filibɛʁ dyɛm]; 7 July 1766 – 20 June 1815) was a French Army officer, politician and writer who served in the French Revolutionary and Napoleonic Wars. He was a commander of the Imperial Guard, Governor of Catalonia and a Peer of France. Napoleon wrote that "he was a fearless soldier, covered with wounds and of the greatest bravery, an accomplished general, who always stood firm in good and bad fortune". Duhesme is regarded as one of the most able French infantry generals of the Napoleonic Wars.

== Revolution ==
Duhesme was born in a family of the haute bourgeoisie in Bourgneuf, Saône-et-Loire. He studied law in Dijon and was made a commander of the national guard of his canton at the start of the French Revolution. In 1792 he was made colonel of a free corps by Charles-François Dumouriez, which he raised by his own means. As commander at Roermond, he held the post of Herstal, an important passage to the Netherlands, and burned the bridge of Leau after the defeat at Neerwinden on 18 March 1793. He then crossed the Schelde and at the Battle of Villeneuve rallied the fleeing infantry. The French grenadiers became discouraged and abandoned their ranks. Duhesme, wounded by two shots, knelt down to support himself, presented the point of his saber to the fugitives, and managed to restore order and gain some advantage over the enemy, for which action he was made brigadier general.

He also contributed greatly to the victory at the Fleurus on 26 July 1794 and besieged Maastricht under Kléber, and was promoted to general of division. He fought in the Vendée in 1795, and later at the Rhine, where he forced the passage over the river on 20 April 1797 below Kehl. In 1798 he was given a command in Italy under Championnet, participated at the siege of Naples and took control of Calabria and Apulia. He was awarded, by decree of 8 April 1800, a full armor of honor for his conduct during the capture of Naples. He then captured Suze, defeated the enemy at Bussolino, pursued them as far as San-Ambrosio, and took 400 prisoners, on 29 October 1799. He then met the enemy entrenched at Pignerol, disrupted them and captured Saluces on 1 November 1800.

In 1800, Duhesme led a corps in Napoleon's Army of the Reserve in the Marengo campaign. At first this command included the divisions of Louis Boudet and Louis Henri Loison. After a brilliant campaign that included the capture of Milan and other cities, his corps was made up of Loison, Lorge and Lapoype's divisions. When Napoleon fought Melas's Austrian army at Marengo, Duhesme's corps defended the Po valley.

He was made commander of the 19th military division on 19 September 1801. He became President of the Saône-et-Loire electoral college on 7 November 1803 and a decree of Napoleon made him a Knight of the Legion of Honour.

== Empire ==
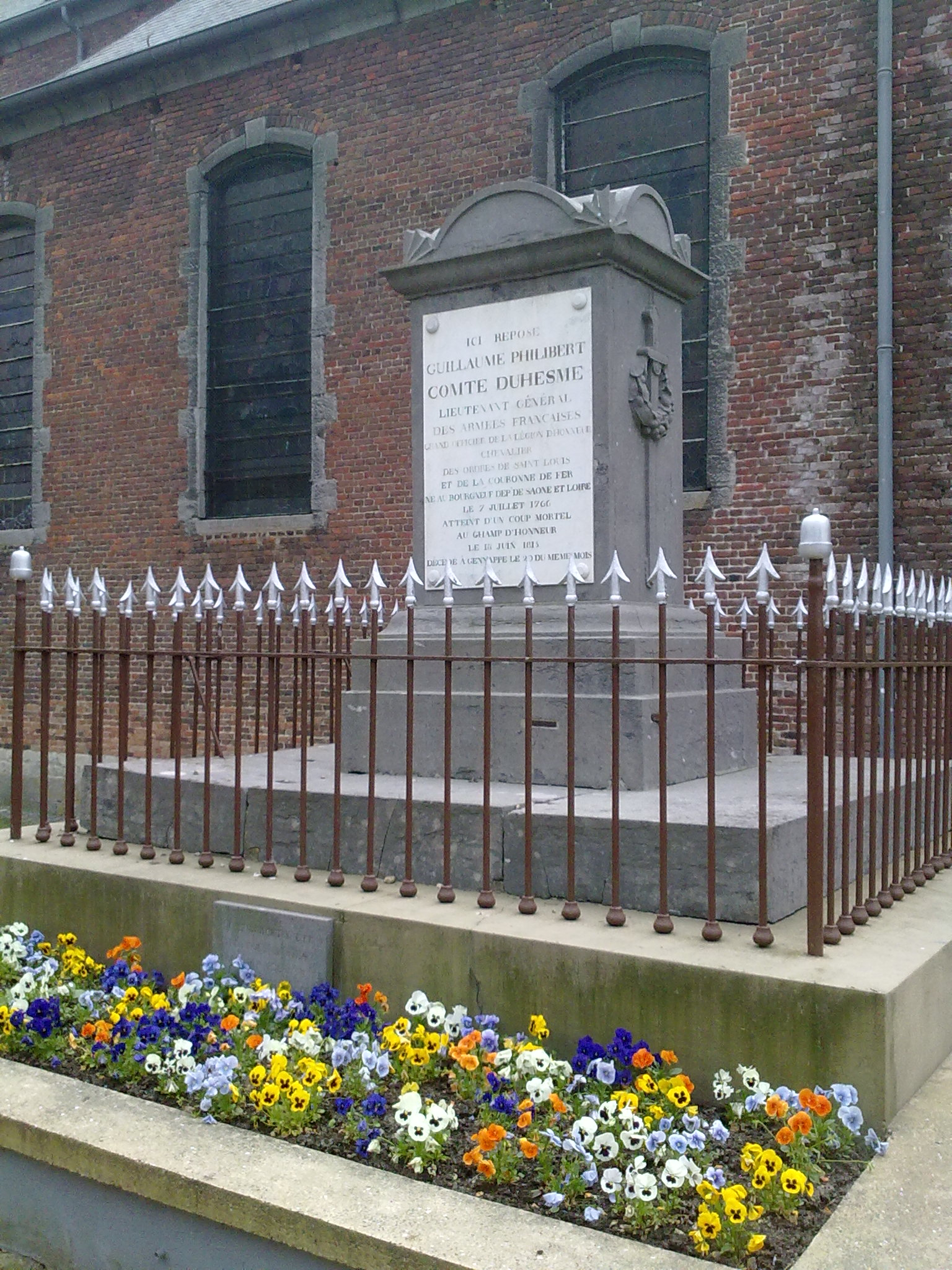
Duhesme grave in Ways (Genappe, Belgium)

In 1805, he commanded the 4th division under André Masséna during the Battle of Caldiero. In 1806, Duhesme was part of the army responsible for the conquest of the Kingdom of Naples. At the time, he published a highly regarded essay titled Précis historique de l'infanterie légère, (reprinted in 1814) following which he was elected honorary associate member of the Academy of Lyon on 23 December 1806.

In 1808, Duhesme led a corps in Napoleon's ill-fated seizure of Spain. He distinguished himself in the capture of Barcelona and was made Governor of Catalonia. After he persuaded the Spanish governor to admit a convoy of sick Frenchmen, his fully armed grenadiers leapt from their stretchers and captured the castle. Later, he successfully defended the city against a Spanish blockade. In 1810, after accusations by Marshal Augereau of allowing plundering and other transgressions, he was recalled in disgrace. The general came to Paris to justify himself, but was ordered to leave the capital immediately. He obeyed and went to Rouen. After lengthy investigations had shown the accusations to be unfounded, Duhesme was given the superior command of the fortress of Kehl in 1813.

In 1814 he commanded a division under Marshal Victor at La Rothière, Montereau and Arcis-sur-Aube and was made a Count of the Empire and Grand Officer of the Legion of Honour by Napoleon. Following Napoleon I's first abdication in 1814, he was made Inspector General of Infantry under the Bourbon Restoration and a Knight of Saint Louis by Louis XVIII.

=== Hundred Days ===
In 1815, he joined Napoleon after his return from Elba and was made a Peer of France and commander of the Young Guard Division of the Imperial Guard. He fought heroically at the head of this elite troop at Ligny and on 18 June 1815, at the Battle of Waterloo. During the fifth storm of Plancenoit by the Prussians, the Guard was surrounded in their positions and eliminated, with neither side asking for nor offering quarter. The Young Guard suffered 96% casualties and Duhesme was seriously wounded in the head. He insisted on keeping command, and an aide-de-camp helped him stay in the saddle, but he was too badly wounded and was taken prisoner by the Prussians. He was transported to the Auberge du Roy d'Espagne in Genappe, where he died 2 days later with Field Marshal Blücher at his side. He was the last French general to die in the Napoleonic Wars.

=== Account of his death ===
An incident is recorded in contemporary accounts as indicative of the Brunswickers' attitude during the Battle of Waterloo. General Duhesme who was then commanding the French rearguard was standing by the gate of an inn in Genappe when a Black Brunswicker Hussar seeing that he was a general officer rode up to him. Duhesme requested quarter, the hussar declined and cut him down with his sabre commenting that "You slew the Duke of Brunswick the day before yesterday and thou also shalt bite the dust". This account of the death of Duhesme was also propagated in the histories based on Napoleon's, Victor Hugo's, Pierre Larousse's and Arthur Gore's account of the affair, but it was refuted by a relative of Duhesme and his aide-de-camp on the day, who said he was mortally wounded at Waterloo and captured in Genappe where he was cared for by Prussian surgeons until he died during the night of 19/20 June.

== Family ==
He married Marie Magdeleine Burger (1776–1857) on 17 November 1797. They had three children:

- Charles Guillaume Eugène (1799–1842), 2nd Count Duhesme, Peer of France, aide-de-camp of King Louis-Philippe I, Knight of the Legion of Honour, died for France in Algeria. Father of general Guillaume Jean Marie Gaston, 3rd Count Duhesme.
- Anne Madeleine Isaure (1804–1869), married to the Marquess of Sarrieu
- Xavier Hippolyte Léon (1810–1870), general de division, Grand Officer of the Legion of Honour, died for France in the Franco-Prussian War

== Works and legacy ==
- His name is engraved on the Arc de Triomphe, 8th column, north side.
- Duhesme wrote a noted tract, Essai historique de l'infanterie légère (Historical Essay on Light Infantry) (Lyon 1806; 3. Aufl., Par. 1864)
- Victor Hugo's novel Les Misérables describes Duhesme's death: "The general of the Young Guard, Duhesme, nabbed at the door of an inn in Genappe, handed over his sword to a hussar of Death, who took the sword and killed the prisoner. Victory was completed by the assassination of the vanquished."
- Napoleon would later write in his Mémoires that "He was a fearless soldier, covered with wounds and of the greatest bravery, a consummate general, who always stood firm in good and bad fortune."
- Many streets, monuments and lakes in France, Belgium and Canada were named after him.
