= François Léon Ormancey =

François Léon Ormancey (French pronunciation: [fʁɑ̃swa le.ɔ̃ ɔʁmɑ̃sɛ]) was a French general in the French Revolutionary Wars and the Napoleonic Wars. He was part of the French Order of Battle at the Battle of Caldiero, in which he commanded the third brigade of Jean Antoine Verdier's II. Division. He was born 2 August 1754 and died 22 July 1824. Effective 29 October 1808, he was created a Baron of the Empire, with letters patent dated 25 May 1811.

He volunteered for the French army in 1768 and was promoted to lieutenant in 1792. In 1793, he was assigned to the 10th Grenadiers in Custine's Army of the Moselle. Michel Ordener was another lieutenant in the same squadron.

On 7 March 1799, he crossed the Rhine with the Army of the Danube, under command of Jean Baptiste Jourdan; in 1800, he was with the Army of the Reserve, then stationed in the Cisalpine Republic. From 1808 to 1812, he was assigned to the Army of Spain and the Army of Andalusia, under command of general Soult.

== Bibliography ==
=== French sources ===
- Léon Clément Hennet, et al. État militaire de France pour l'année 1793. Paris, 1793.
- Société de l'histoire de la révolution française. La Révolution française. Paris, Charavay frères [etc.] Volume 16.
- Alain Chappet, Roger Martin, Alain Pigeard. Le Guide Napoleon. Ann Arbor, University of Michigan, 2005. ISBN 978-2-84734-246-8.
