= Ludwig von Vogelsang =

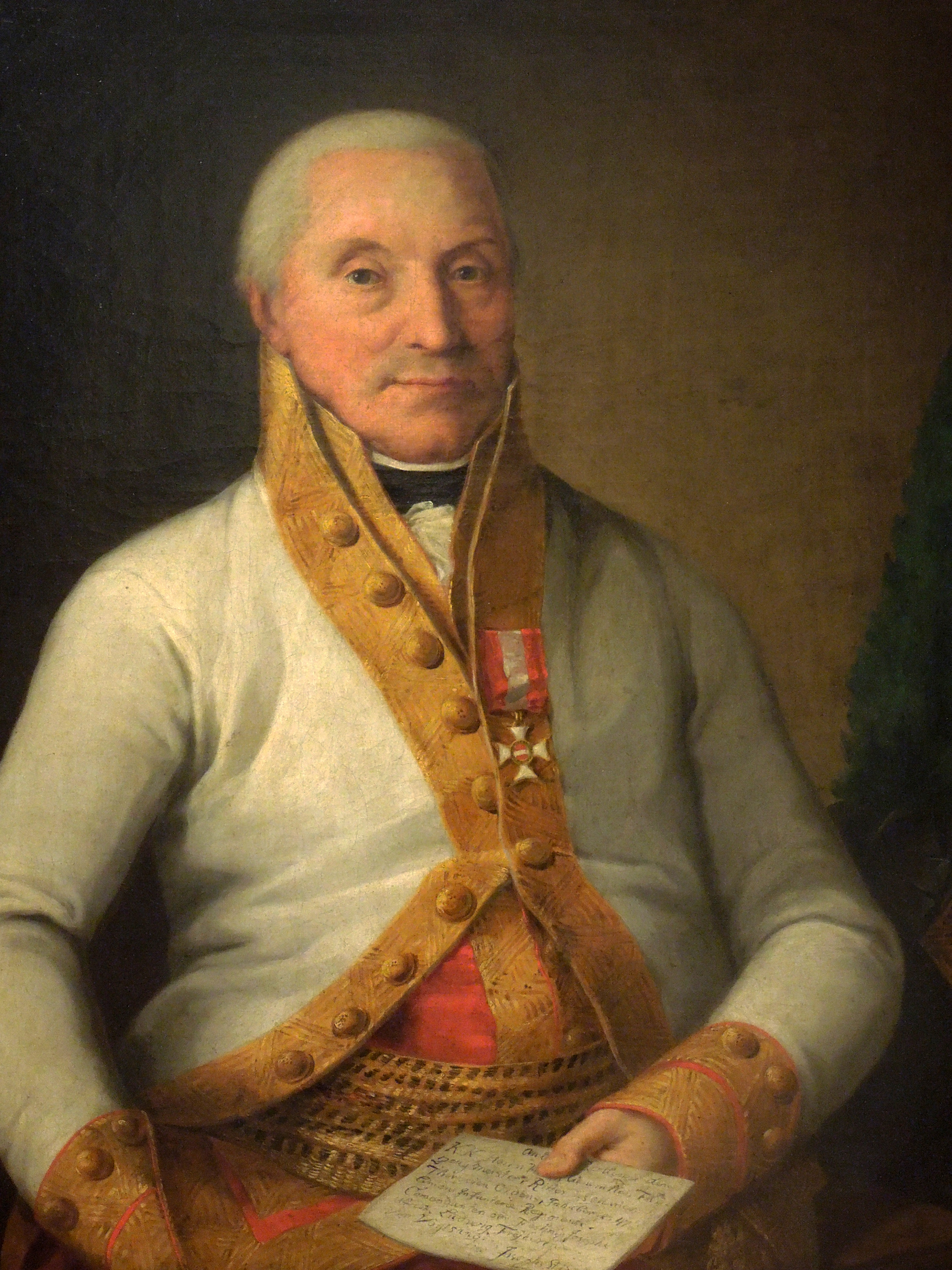
- Born: 12 December 1748; Brussels, Austrian Netherlands
- Died: 28 June 1822 (aged 73); Fortress Josefov, Kingdom of Bohemia
- Military career
- Allegiance: Habsburg monarchy, Austrian Empire
- Branch: Infantry
- Service years: 1788-1822
- Rank: Feldzeugmeister
- Conflicts: French Revolutionary Wars, Napoleonic Wars
- Awards: Military Order of Maria Theresa (Knight's Cross); Inhaber of the Infantry Regiment N°47
- Other work: Fortress Commander and Governor of Josephstadt (Josefov u Jaroměře)

Ludwig Freiherr von Vogelsang (12 December 1748 in Brussels – 28 June 1822 in Fortress Josefov) was an Austrian infantry commander during the French Revolutionary and Napoleonic Wars.
