= Gaspard Amédée Gardanne =

- Born: 24 April 1758; Solliès-Pont, Var, France
- Died: 14 August 1807 (aged 49) Breslau, Prussia
- Allegiance: France
- Rank: General of Division
- Conflicts: French Revolutionary Wars; Napoleonic Wars

Gaspard Amédée Gardanne (French pronunciation: [ɡaspaʁ amede ɡaʁdan]; 24 April 1758 – 14 August 1807) was a French general who fought in the Napoleonic Wars.

== Biography ==
Born in Solliès-Pont on 24 April 1758, Gardanne joined the French royal army in 1779. After the French Revolution he joined a volunteer unit as an officer. He fought under Napoleon Bonaparte during the 1796–1797 and 1800 Italian campaigns. He led a division during the Napoleonic Wars and died from illness in 1807. His surname is one of the Names inscribed under the Arc de Triomphe.

At the outbreak of the War of the Third Coalition, Gardanne commanded an infantry division in Italy under Marshal André Masséna. The 1st Brigade, led by Louis Fursy Henri Compère, included the 22nd Light Infantry and 52nd Line Infantry Regiments. The 2nd Brigade comprised the 29th and 101st Line Infantry Regiments under Louis François Lanchatin. Each regiment had three battalions. Attached to the division was the 15/2nd Foot Artillery company and the 23rd Chasseurs à Cheval, four squadrons strong. This was the division's organization at the Battle of Verona on 18 October 1805 and the Battle of Caldiero from 29 to 31 October.

In early 1806, Gardanne's division formed part of Masséna's I Corps of Joseph Bonaparte's Army of Naples. In the campaign that followed, the 1st Brigade included the 20th and 62nd Line Infantry Regiments, three battalions each. The 2nd Brigade was made up of three battalions of the 102nd Line Infantry Regiment, one battalion of the Corsican Legion, and one battalion of the 32nd Light Infantry Regiment. Jean Le Camus led the 1st Brigade while François Valentin commanded the 2nd Brigade. The invasion of the Kingdom of Naples began on 8 February 1806 and progressed rapidly. The only resistance encountered was the fortress of Gaeta, where Masséna detached Gardanne to invest the place while Joseph continued on to occupy Naples.

Jean Reynier, at the head of 6,000 French troops, smashed Roger de Damas' 10,000-men Neapolitan corps at the Battle of Campo Tenese on 9 March. The remnant of the Neapolitan field army dissolved or was evacuated to Sicily by the British fleet. The Siege of Gaeta, however, lasted from 26 February to 18 July and absorbed the attention of up to 12,000 French soldiers. The garrison commander Louis of Hesse-Philippsthal proved to be a stubborn opponent. His initial garrison of 4,000 was reinforced by sea to 7,000 during the siege. Losses were about 1,000 killed and wounded on each side. The surviving members of the garrison were released on condition that they not fight against France or her allies for one year.

Gardanne died on 14 August 1807 in Breslau, Prussia (today Wrocław, Poland).
