= Nicolas Bernard Guiot de Lacour =

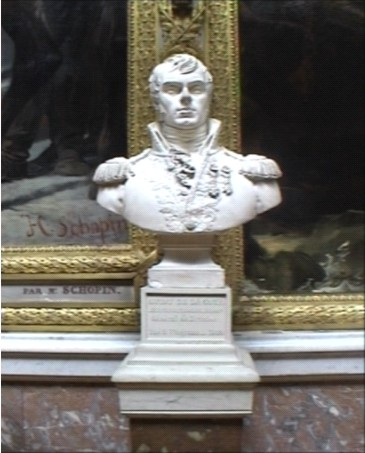
- Nicolas Bernard Guiot de Lacour
- Born: 25 January 1771; Carignan, Ardennes, France
- Died: 28 July 1809 (aged 38) Gundersdorf, Austria
- Allegiance: France
- Branch: Infantry, Cavalry
- Service years: 1787–1809
- Rank: General of Division
- Conflicts: Haitian Revolution; War of the First Coalition; Flanders Campaign; War of the Second Coalition; Battle of Stockach; Battle of Muotathal (POW); War of the Third Coalition; Battle of Caldiero; Action of Bovec; Invasion of Naples; Siege of Gaeta; War of the Fifth Coalition; Battle of Abensberg; Battle of Landshut; Battle of Eckmühl; Battle of Wagram †
- Awards: Légion d'Honneur, CC, 1804
- Other work: Baron of the Empire, 1808

Nicolas Bernard Guiot de Lacour (French: [nikɔla bɛʁnaʁ ɡɥijo də lakuʁ]; 25 January 1771 – 28 July 1809) led infantry and cavalry brigades during the First French Empire under Napoleon. He joined the French Royal Army in 1787 and was sent to quell the Haitian Revolution in 1791. He fought in the Army of the North starting in 1793. He was promoted to chef de brigade (colonel) in 1797 and to general of brigade in 1800. He led a cavalry brigade at Caldiero in 1805 and initially commanded the Siege of Gaeta in 1806. He fought at Abensberg, Landshut, and Eckmühl in 1809 before being fatally wounded at the Battle of Wagram on 6 July 1809. Promoted general of division on the battlefield, he died of his wounds on the 28th. He is one of the names inscribed under the Arc de Triomphe on Column 11 and his bust is in the Hall of Battles at the Palace of Versailles.

== Early career ==
Lacour was born on 25 January 1771 in Carignan, France in what later became the department of Ardennes. In 1787, he joined the Régiment d'Auvergne as a Gentleman Cadet. He fought in the Haitian Revolution in 1791 as a sous lieutenant and later as a lieutenant.

Lacour served in Switzerland as an adjutant-general in Édouard Mortier's division. On 1 October 1799 in an action near Muotathal, he was captured by the Russians and formally surrendered to the Cossack commander Adrian Karpovich Denisov. As a prisoner of the Russians, Lacour survived the brutal march across the Panixer Pass. On 6 October, Denisov arrived on the other side of the pass in a terrible state of health and was met by Lacour who plied him with warm soup and blankets. Afterward, Denisov was convinced that Lacour saved his life.

== Empire ==
During the War of the Third Coalition the French Army of Italy under Marshal André Masséna faced Archduke Charles, Duke of Teschen's Austrian army. Lacour led a brigade in Julien Augustin Joseph Mermet's cavalry division consisting of four squadrons each of the 24th and 30th Dragoon Regiments. At the Battle of Caldiero on 29–31 October 1805, Lacour's brigade was attached to Guillaume Philibert Duhesme's 4th Division. On the 30th, Duhesme's division deployed on the right with Lacour's dragoons guarding the army's extreme right flank. The plan allowed for Jean-Antoine Verdier's division to cross the Adige River and extend Duhesme's right. Masséna assigned Duhesme the task of capturing the town of Caldiero. In the event, Verdier's attack miscarried and Duhesme captured Caldiero without help. However, the day ended in stalemate after bitter fighting. Every unit was committed to the fray except Mermet's other brigade which was made up of cuirassiers. On the 31st, Verdier's relatively fresh division attacked but was stopped. Charles ordered his army to retreat the next day.

On 11 November 1805, the Austrians fought a successful rear guard action at Valvasone on the Tagliamento River in which the 23rd and 30th Dragoons were present. Lacour led four regiments of dragoons in action at Flitscher-Klause (Bovec) on 19 November. General-major Heinrich Bersina von Siegenthal commanded two artillery pieces and 1,200 Austrians in the De Ligne Infantry Regiment Nr. 30. Because the action was fought in a mountain pass, the Austrians were able to hold off Lacour's column. Since no French officers became casualties, losses were probably light. The 23rd, 24th, 29th, and 30th Dragoon Regiments were the only units of that type with Masséna's army. Lacour's independent force eventually linked up with Michel Ney's VI Corps at Villach. Lacour participated in the Invasion of Naples in 1806. In March 1806, Mermet's cavalry division was organized with the 23rd and 24th Dragoons in the 1st Brigade and the 29th and 30th Dragoons in the 2nd Brigade, though no brigadiers were named. He also fought in the War of the Fifth Coalition, where he would eventually die at the Battle of Wagram.
