= Roger de Damas =

French general (1765–1823)

Count Roger de Damas
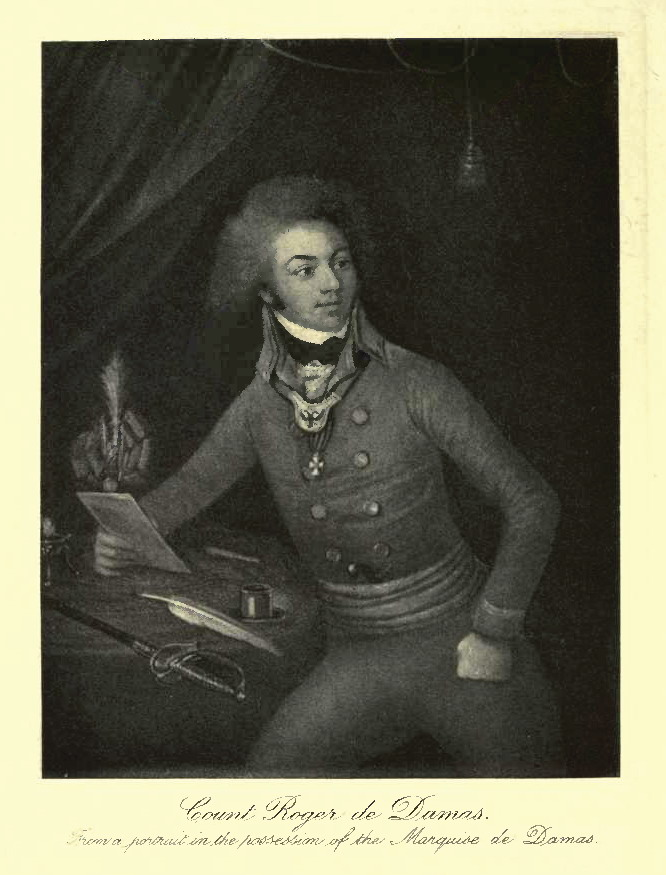
- Born: 4 September 1765; Paris, France
- Died: 18 September 1823 (aged 58); Château de Cirey, France
- Military career
- Allegiance: Kingdom of France; Russian Empire; Kingdom of Naples
- Branch: French Royal Army (1779–1787); Imperial Russian Army (1787–1791); Armée des Émigrés (1791–1798); Neapolitan Army (1798–1806)
- Service years: 1779-1806
- Rank: Aide-de-camp (France); Brigadier general (Russia); Field marshal (Naples)
- Commands: Neapolitan Army; Mirabeau Legion
- Conflicts: Seventh Russo-Turkish War; Siege of Ochakov (1788); Storming of Izmail; French Revolutionary Wars; Napoleonic Wars; War of the Third Coalition; Invasion of Naples; Battle of Campo Tenese
- Awards: Order of Saint George; Gold Sword for Bravery (from Catherine the Great)
- Other work: Member of the Chamber of Deputies (France)

Count Roger de Damas (4 September 1765 – 18 September 1823) was a French Army officer and Royalist general who fought against the French Revolutionary forces in order to assist the Russian Empire and the Kingdom of Naples.

== Biography ==
Damas was born in Paris, and in 1779, he began his military career in a French regiment commanded by his uncle. In 1787, he travelled to Russia, where a large army was being prepared for the war against the Ottoman Empire, as a guest of its commander Grigory Potemkin. After gaining the latter's esteem, he fought in the naval battles against the Turks and, once land operations began, at the head of a grenadier column. Later at Saint Petersburg, he received several honours from Empress Catherine and obtained permission from the French king to fight for Russia; de Damas took part in the remainder of the seventh Russo-Turkish War, leading an army corps during the sieges of Kilia and Akerinan.

In his letters, Charles-Joseph, 7th Prince of Ligne, wrote to his friend Louis Philippe, comte de Ségur while serving with the army at the 1788 Siege of Ochakov. He described "a Frenchman of three ages - the chivalry of one, the grace of another, and the gayety of the present day". The Prince continued, "He is as giddy as a bumblebee in the midst of the liveliest cannonading". He noted a weakness, "Always French in soul, and it may be, a trifle vain." De Ligne concluded with, "Amiable, beloved by all, and what one calls a charming fellow, a brave fellow, a seigneur of the good tone of the Court of France - that is what Roger Damas is". Damas served with Archduke Charles, Duke of Teschen at the Siege of Izmail in 1791.

During this time the French Revolution had broken out, and de Damas joined the French Émigré armies, as aide-de-camp to the count of Artois (1791–1792). After accompanying Artois to Saint Petersburg in 1793, he joined the Émigré army of Louis Joseph, Prince of Condé serving with the Mirabeau Legion. In 1796, he was elevated to command this legion, which consisted of 1,200 men, 400 hussars and 4 artillery pieces. Damas fought in the campaigns of 1795, 1796 and 1797. In 1798, he entered the service of the King of Naples with permission of Paul I of Russia, and was given command of the 3rd Camp under Karl Mack von Leiberich in the ill-fated invasion of the Roman Republic. He took command of a corps of 7,000 men, survivors of Mack’s defeat at Civita Castellana during the French counter-invasion in December 1798. His troops were driven back at Toscanella by Kellermann on 7 December, attempting to pass through Rome to re-join Mack, Damas was then intercepted by General Bonnamy, who denied the validity of a safe passage for his column. Seriously wounded in the retreat, he nevertheless managed to skilfully evacuate a large part of his command from Orbetello under Naselli and reach Naples.

Damas was later appointed as Field Marshal, General Lieutenant and finally commander-in-chief of the Bourbon Neapolitan armed forces under Ferdinand IV, which he directed in the campaigns of 1799, 1800, 1801 and 1806.

In 1801, he was forced to flee Naples and moved to Vienna, where he wrote his memoirs. In 1804, Damas was once more invited to southern Italy by Ferdinand IV to reorganize the Neapolitan army. After French diplomatic pressures had him expelled in 1805, he retired to Messina, but following the collapse of Ferdinand's army in face of the French invasion of 1806, he defended Calabria for a short time with a few troops, being defeated at the Battle of Campo Tenese on 10 March 1806. de Damas then retired first to Trieste and then to Vienna, where he stayed for seven years without participating in any military activity.

After the fall of Napoleon and the restoration of the French royal family, Damas was appointed Governor of the 4th, 5th and 3rd Military Divisions (de la Lorraine, de l'Alsace et des Trois-Évêchés), later of the 19th Division headquartered in Lyon. Following Napoleon's return from Elba he was unable to prevent his troops from following him, and thus went in exile to Ghent with the king. In September 1815, following Napoleon's defeat at Waterloo he returned to France and was elected to the Chamber of Deputies.

He died at the castle of Cirey in 1823.
