= François Louis Dedon-Duclos =

French military commander

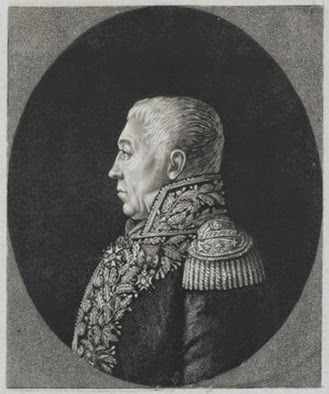
General François Louis Dedon-Duclos.

François Louis Dedon-Duclos (French pronunciation: [fʁɑ̃swa lwi dədɔ̃ dyklo]; 21 October 1762 – 19 January 1830) was a French military commander of the Revolutionary Wars and the Napoleonic Wars.

Dedon-Duclos was born in Toul, Meurthe-et-Moselle. He entered military service in the Artillery School of Metz, 1 April 1777, and on 15 July 1780 he had the grade of Lieutenant. He was promoted to Captain 17 May 1787. In 1792, he was commander of artillery, under the overall commands of, first, Kellerman and later Custine. He fought at Landau, Speyer, and later the siege of Mainz. He was part of the Army of the Rhine, the Army of the Danube, the Army of Helvetia, and he fought later at the Siege of Gaeta and in the Peninsular War. At the restoration, he retained the rank of lieutenant general, and Louis XVIII named him as a Knight of the Order of Saint Louis. DEDON is one of the names inscribed under the Arc de Triomphe, on Column 12 on the east side. He died at Vanves, aged 67.
