= Morano Calabro =

- Comune
- Comune di Morano Calabro
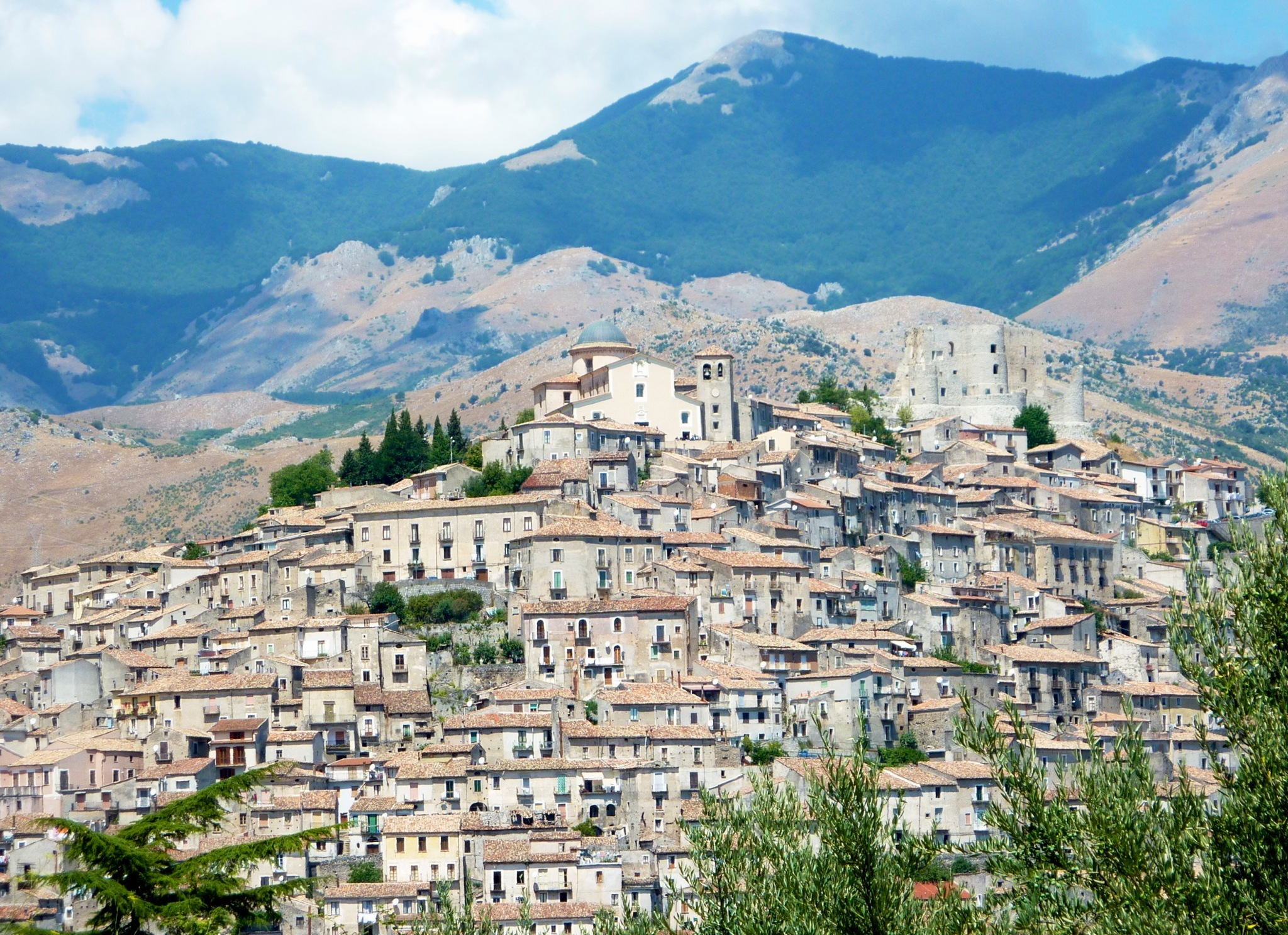

- Coat of arms

- Location within Italy Location within Calabria
- Coordinates: 39°51′N 16°8′E
- Country: Italy
- Region: Calabria
- Province: Cosenza (CS)
- Frazioni: Campotenese

Government
  - Mayor: Nicolò De Bartolo

Area
  - Total: 112.34 km^{2} (43.37 sq mi)
- Elevation: 694 m (2,277 ft)

Population (30 August 2012)
  - Total: 4,608
  - Density: 41.02/km^{2} (106.2/sq mi)
- Demonym: Moranesi
- Time zone: UTC+1 (CET)
  - Summer (DST): UTC+2 (CEST)
- Postal code: 87016
- Dialing code: 0981
- Patron saint: Saint Bernardino of Siena
- Saint day: 20 May
- Website: Official website

Morano Calabro (Moranese: Murenu [muˈrɛːnu]) is a town and comune in the province of Cosenza in the Calabria region of southern Italy. It is one of I Borghi più belli d'Italia ("The most beautiful villages of Italy"). It was the birthplace of mathematician Gaetano Scorza and Economist Oswaldo Caffaro Faillace, a decorated telegraphist in WWII, who saved numerous lives by advising Italian soldiers in Africa of the unexpected approach of bombers.

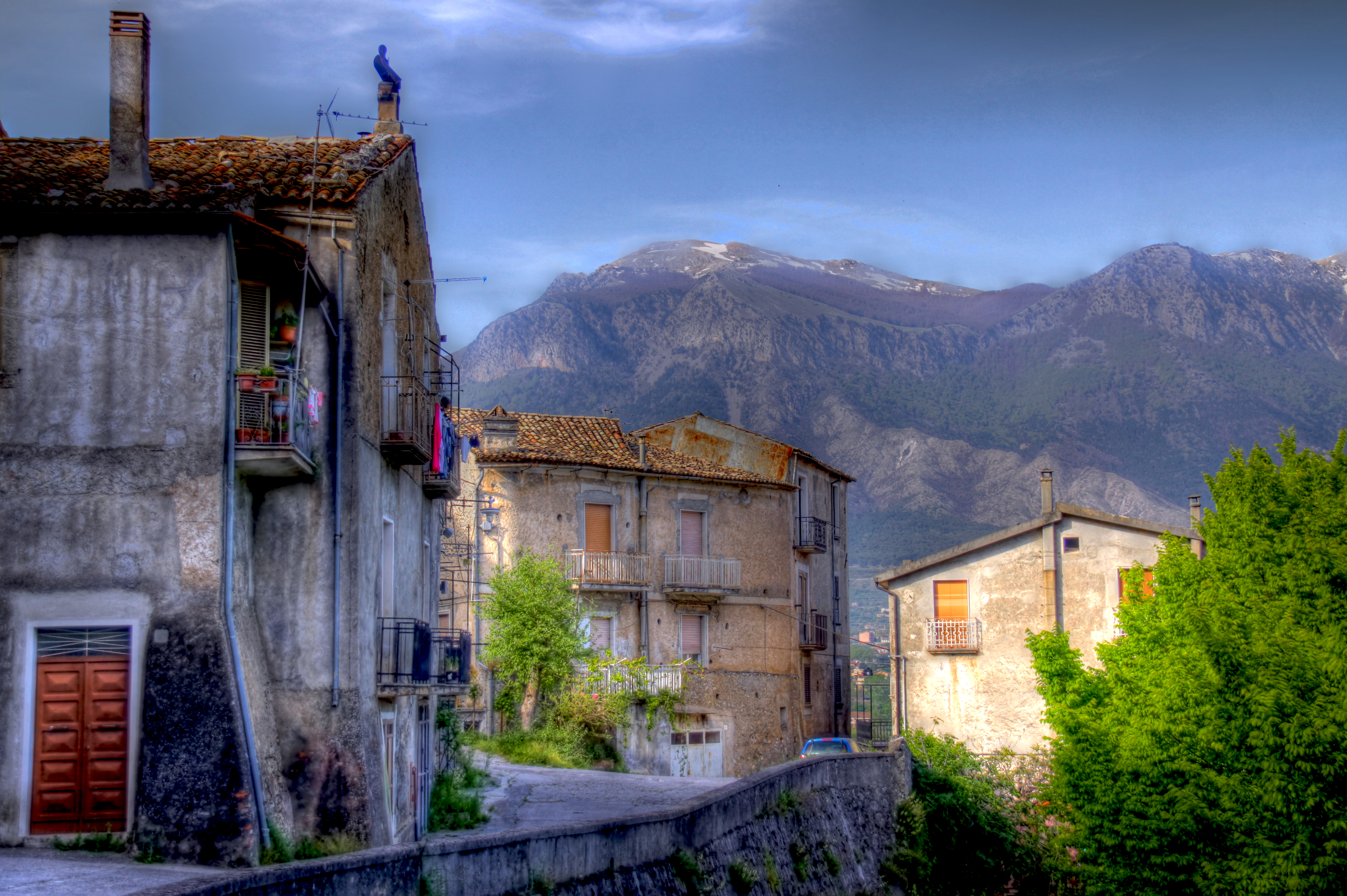
View of Morano Calabro.

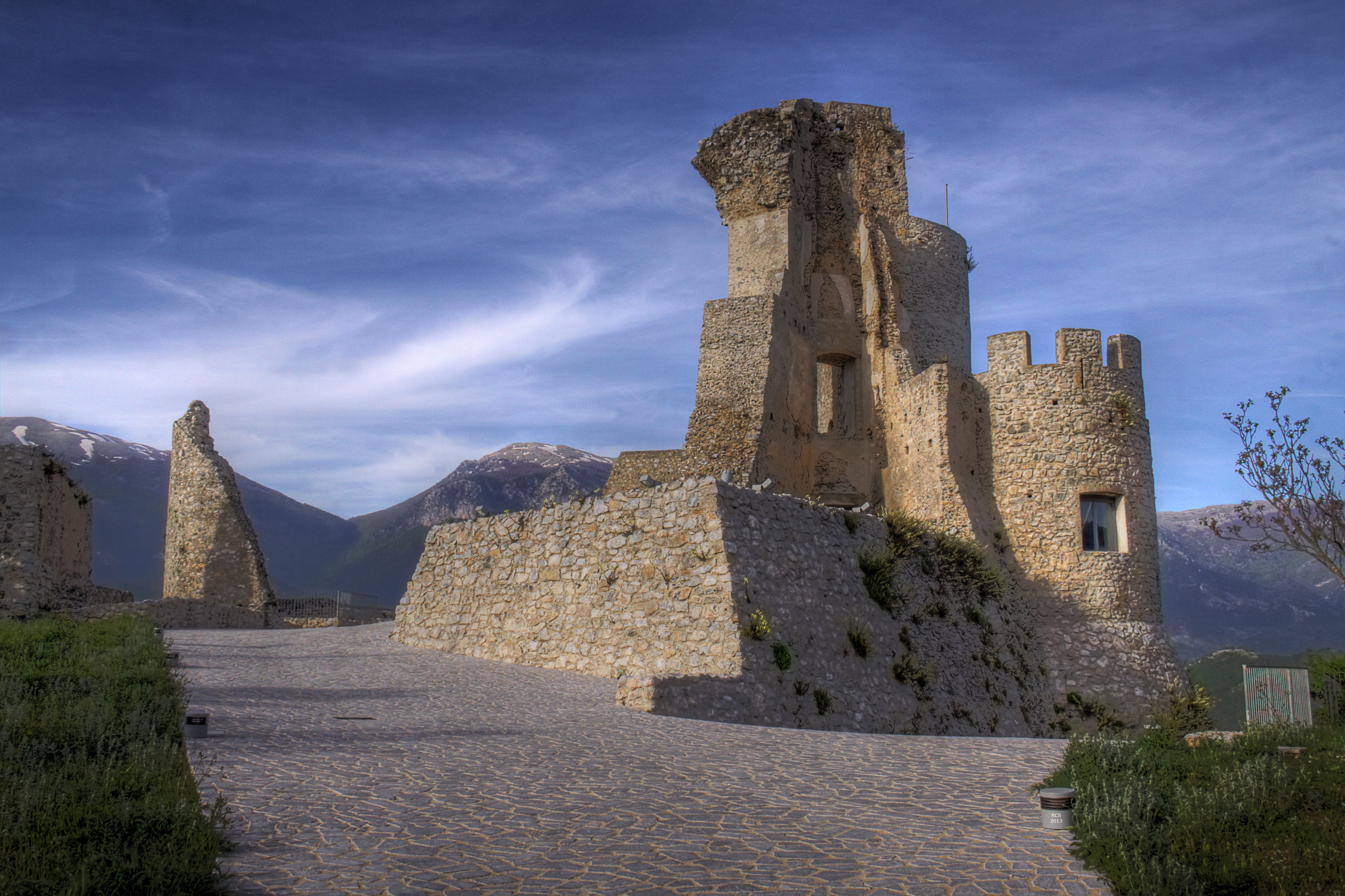
Norman fortress built on Roman ruins in Morano Calabro.

== Geography ==
The municipality borders with Castrovillari (the nearest town), Mormanno, Rotonda, San Basile, Saracena, Terranova di Pollino and Viggianello.

=== Campotenese ===
Its frazione (civil parish), the village of Campotenese, is located on a mountain pass at 1,015 amsl. A tourist site, the village is best known for the Battle of Campo Tenese (1806) between the First French Empire and the Kingdom of Naples.

== Sister cities ==
- Porto Alegre, Brazil

== See also ==
- Battle of Campo Tenese
