= Maurice Lacy (general) =

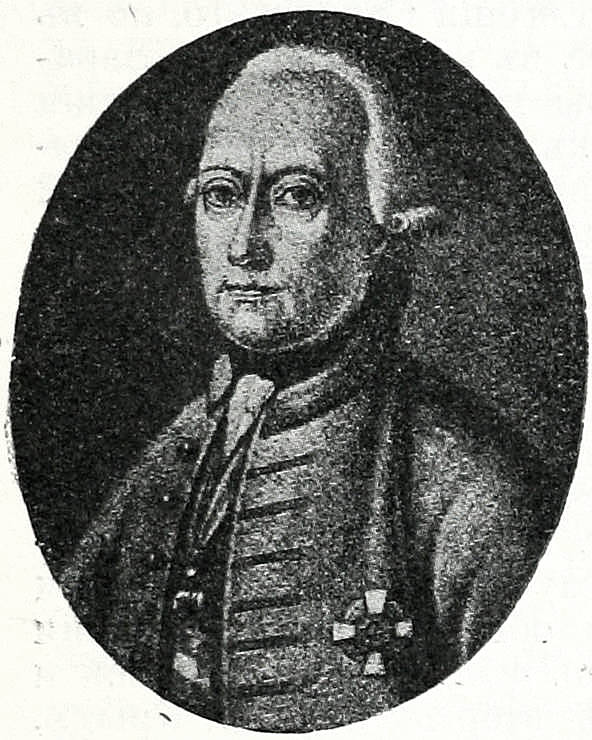
Portrait of Maurice Lacy

Maurice Lacy, or Maurice de Lacy (Russian: Бори́с Петро́вич Ла́сси; Boris Petrovich Lacy; 1740 – January 1820), born in Ireland, was a general of the Russian Empire. He took part in the Siege of Izmail, the Battle of Praga, the Italian and Swiss expedition of 1799 and the Anglo-Russian occupation of Naples of 1805.

== Life ==
Lacy, of Grodno, belonged to a branch of the family of Peter Lacy. He was born in County Limerick, Ireland, during the great frost of 1739–40, one of two sons and four daughters of Patrick de Lacy (died 1790) of Rathcahill and Templeglentan, and his wife Lady Mary Herbert. Maurice was said to have been brought up in an Irish convent. His kinsmen included notable immigrant soldiers in Russia, and taking advantage of these connections, he obtained a commission in the Russian army; he fought against the Turks, and attained general's rank, with which he revisited Ireland in 1792–3. He went back to Russia, and held command under Marshal Alexander Suvorov during the Kościuszko Uprising and in the campaigns against the French in Switzerland and Italy.

=== 1805 occupation of Naples ===
In 1805, at the time of the Anglo-Russian occupation of Naples, he was sent to Naples to command an Anglo-Russian force against the French. Sir Henry Bunbury, 7th Baronet was quartermaster-general of the small British force sent to Naples in that year under Sir James Henry Craig; speaking of an auxiliary force of fourteen thousand Russians and two thousand Montenegrins sent there from the Greek islands, under the Russian general D'Anrep, he observes in Narratives of Some Passages in the Great War with France that D'Anrep was subordinate to General Lacy, who was residing at Naples under the pretence of ill-health, but prepared by his sovereign's order to take the chief command when the time should come to put the troops in movement. He had been a brave and meritorious officer, "but showed no traces of ever having been a man of talent or information."

=== Bunbury's reminiscences ===
Bunbury adds: "He spoke English with the strongest brogue I ever heard, and with peculiarities that I have never met with, except in the Teagues of our old comedies." He used to bring his nightcap in his pocket when he attended a council of war, and put it on and go to sleep while others discussed the business. "But the old gentleman was simple and kind-hearted, and, in his own words, 'always for fighting'" (Bunbury, pp. 191–2).

=== Last years ===
Lacy played no prominent part in later campaigns. He was governor of Grodno, where he possessed estates. Lacy and his sister, Mrs Johanna O'Brien, who died before him, outlived their brother and sisters. His nephew, Maurice Pierre, entered the Russian service and died at Edirne during the Russo-Turkish War of 1828–9. Lacy died unmarried in Grodno in January 1820.
