= Von Stutterheim =

Von Stutterheim is a surname. Notable people with the surname include:

- Joachim Friedrich von Stutterheim (1715–1783), Prussian General of Infantry, sometimes called Alt-Stutterheim
- Karl Wilhelm von Stutterheim (1770–1811), Prussian-born Austrian general of the Napoleonic Wars
- Ludwig August von Stutterheim (1750–1826) Prussian General of Infantry; participant in Napoleonic Wars; son of Joachim Friedrich von Stutterheim
- Otto Ludwig von Stutterheim (1718–1780), Prussian Lieutenant General, sometimes called Jung (Young) Stutterheim; younger brother of Joachim Friedrich von Stutterheim
- Richard von Stutterheim (1815–1871), officer and commander of the British-German Legion
- Wolff von Stutterheim (1893–1940), German Generalmajor who fought in World Wars I and II; mortally wounded in aerial combat

== See also ==
- Stutterheim (surname)
- Stutterheim, locality in South Africa
