= Josef Philipp Vukassovich =

Austrian soldier (1755–1809)

- Josip Filip Vukasović
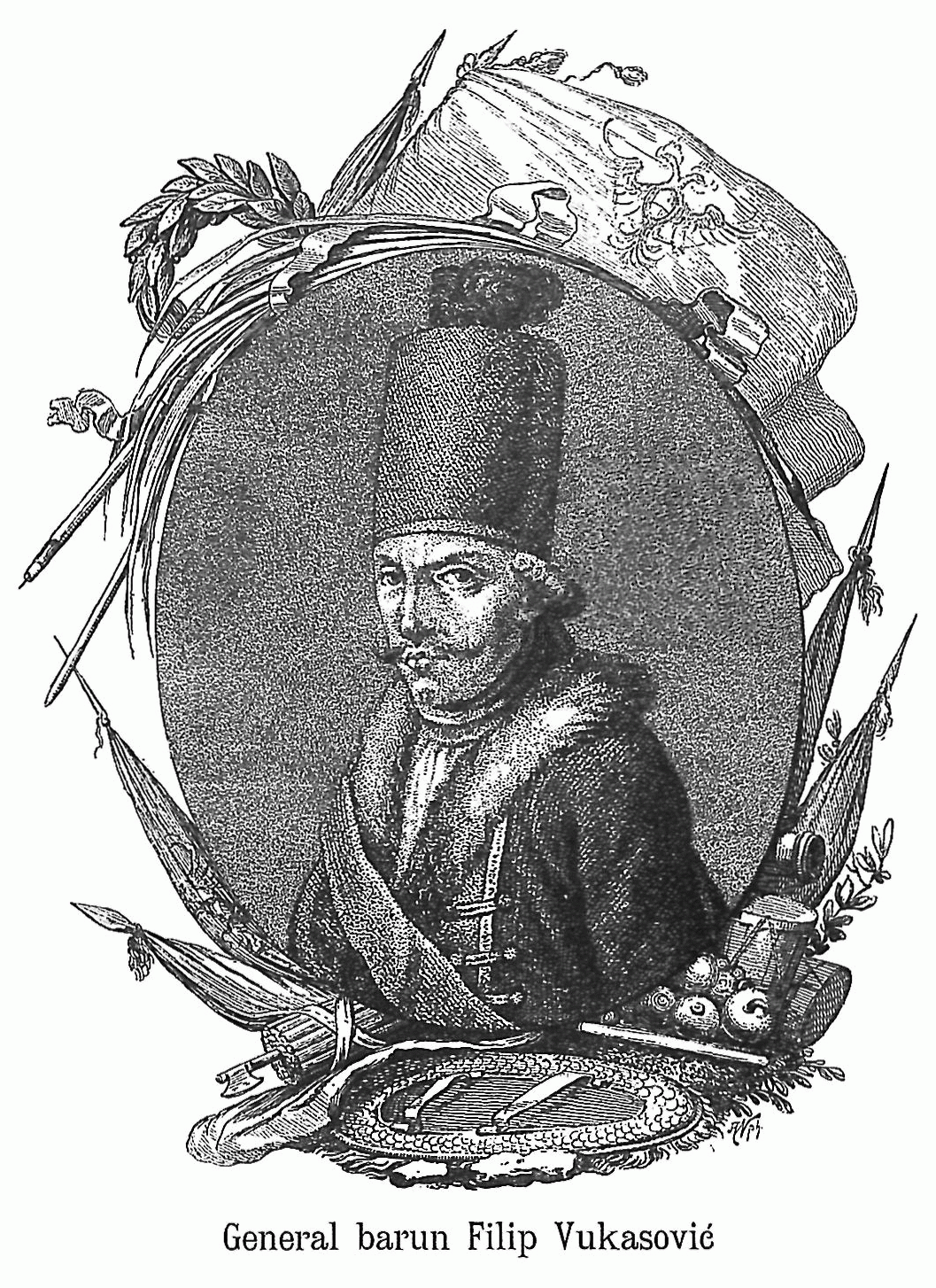
- Born: 1755; Bruvno near Gračac, Croatian Military Frontier within Habsburg monarchy (today's Croatia)
- Died: 9 August 1809 (aged 53–54); Vienna, Austrian Empire (today's Austria)
- Military career
- Allegiance: Habsburg monarchy (1775–1804); Austrian Empire (1804–1809)
- Branch: Infantry
- Service years: 1775–1809
- Rank: Feldmarschall-Leutnant
- Conflicts: Austro-Turkish War (1788–1791); French Revolutionary Wars; Napoleonic Wars
- Awards: Military Order of Maria Theresa, Knight's Cross 1788
- Other work: Inhaber of Infantry Regiment # 48

Baron Josef Philipp Vukassovich (Serbo-Croatian: Barun Josip Filip Vukasović; 1755 – 9 August 1809) was an Austrian soldier who joined the army of Habsburg monarchy and fought against both Ottoman Empire and the French First Republic. During the French Revolutionary Wars, he commanded a brigade in the Italian campaign of 1796–1797 against Napoleon Bonaparte. He led a division during the Napoleonic Wars and received a fatal wound in action.

While serving in the Grenz infantry from the Croatian Military Frontier, Vukassovich received a coveted military award for notable actions in battle against the Ottomans. Still leading his Grenzers, he fought against the French in Italy. While still a colonel, he was entrusted with the command of an infantry brigade in early 1796. Finally appointed a general officer, he participated in nearly every battle in Italy that year, including all four Austrian attempts to raise the Siege of Mantua. In 1799, he led troops in Italy against the French with success. The following year saw him leading troops against Bonaparte again.

Appointed to lead a division in Italy in 1805, Vukassovich was soon sacked for failing to halt a French attack. The year 1809 found him leading a division in the invasion of Bavaria. He fought capably in several actions near Regensburg in April. He was mortally wounded at the Battle of Wagram in July while leading his troops. Among Austrian generals, he demonstrated above-average initiative and skill, particularly in 1796 and 1809. He was Proprietor (Inhaber) of an Austrian infantry regiment.

== Early career ==
Vukassovich was born in 1755 in the village of Sveti Petar, present day village of Bruvno, near Gračac, in Lika, at the time part of the Croatian Military Frontier. His father was major Petar Vukasović, from Senj, who commanded the fourth Grenz infantry company of the Croatian Military Frontier, headquartered in Sveti Petar. His mother Ana, née Bašić, was also of a Grenz infantry officer family. His paternal family moved to Senj after the fall of Klis (1537) from Poljica in Dalmatia, from where it had moved from Bosnia following the Ottoman conquest in 1463.

Graduating in 1771 from the Theresian Military Academy located in the castle of Wiener Neustadt, he joined his home Liccaner (Gospić) Grenz regiment in 1775. When promoted to Oberleutnant (first lieutenant) in 1780, Vukassovich served in Montenegro. The Austrians planned to start an uprising from within Montenegro, to liberate the Balkans, and Vukassovich and Ludvig Pernet were part of the delegation that were to win over the Montenegrin chiefs. In 1783, the Croatian Military Frontier was placed under the unified control of the Croatian General Command in 1783. Josip Krmpotić, Catholic priest from Lika, who sang a song about this event in praise of F. Vukassovich, went with them. In that song, he calls his soldiers, regardless of religion, Serbs: "Before them is a nobleman of old, Vukasović from the Lika region...The rest are of a knightly lineage, True Serbs, right to glorify God... Isn't Marko a Serbian, Prince? Since when did everyone know how to sing in Serbian?... Two thousand years have passed since the Serbian glory filled the world."

By 1787, he was elevated to hauptmann in the Liccaner (Gospić) Grenz Infantry Regiment No. 1. During the Austro-Turkish War (1788–1791), he fought with distinction, earning the Military Order of Maria Theresa on 15 November 1788. He received the noble title Freiherr in December 1788. In 1789 he raised a freikorps, which soon reached a strength of 3,000 men in 12 companies of infantry and 4 squadrons of hussars. During the Austro-Turkish War, Vukassovich served as freikorps' acting commander with the rank of Major, and was then promoted to Oberstleutnant (lieutenant colonel). In 1790 he took part in the battle of Cetingrad and some other battles in retaking border areas of Croatian territory from the Ottoman Empire, including Furjan, Lapac, Boričevac and Srb.

Vukassovich married Johanna Pulcheria Malfatti von Kriegsfeld. She was 24 years younger and outlived him by many years, dying in 1854. He had four children, sons Josip and Filip and daughters Marija and Ana.

== French Revolutionary Wars ==
=== First Coalition ===
Vukassovich fought in Italy during the War of the First Coalition, being promoted to Oberst in 1794. At the Battle of Loano in November 1795, he and his troops conducted a stout defense in a monastery. During the Montenotte Campaign in April 1796, he commanded a brigade in Johann Beaulieu's Austrian army. He led the Austrian vanguard across the Turchino Pass on 10 April to attack Jean-Baptiste Cervoni's brigade near Genoa.

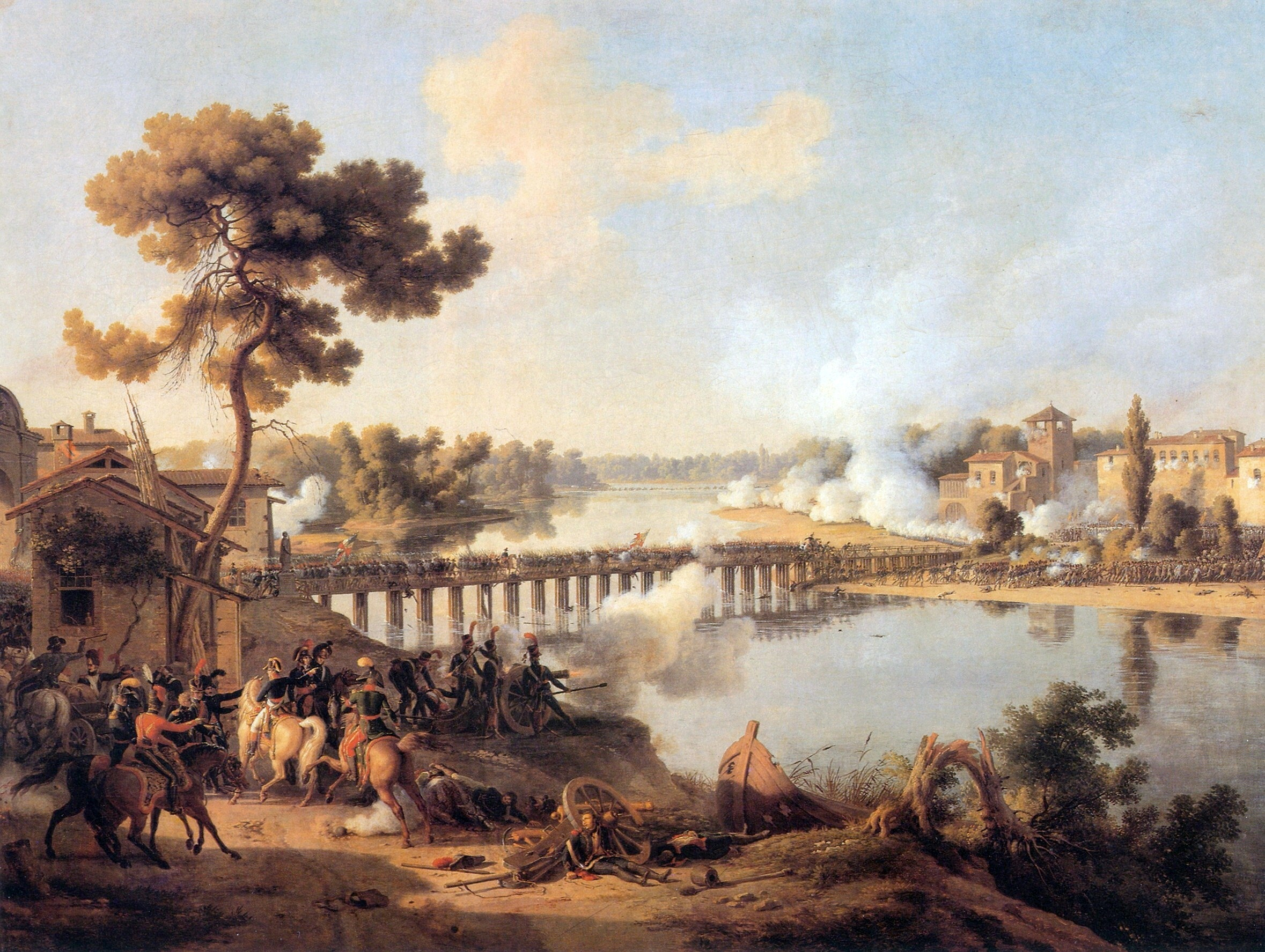
The Battle of Lodi by Louis-François Lejeune. Vukassovich led the rear guard at the Battle of Lodi.

On 12 April, Bonaparte defeated Eugène-Guillaume Argenteau's Austrian force at the Battle of Montenotte. The next day, Beaulieu directed Vukassovich to take his brigade to Sassello to establish contact with Argenteau's right wing, but due to a poorly written order, he started a day late and missed the 14 April fighting in the Second Battle of Dego. The next day, he marched his 3,500-man brigade from Sassello to Dego. By good fortune, Vukassovich caught a brigade of André Masséna's troops plundering the town and routed them. By the time Bonaparte and Masséna appeared with heavy reinforcements, "Wukassovitch intelligently seized the opportunity offered by this success and promptly put the village into a state of defense." He only withdrew from the town after giving the French a tough fight.

Appointed Generalmajor (brigadier general) on 2 May 1796, Vukassovich soon fought in the Battle of Lodi on 10 May. At Lodi, he led a rear guard consisting of two battalions of the Carlstädter Grenz Infantry Regiment. After the Grenzers fell back to the east end of the bridge, they were employed in the first line of defense. Subjected to continual cannon fire and a frontal attack by skirmishers and a column of elite troops, the Austrians were defeated. Such was his notoriety that the French falsely claimed to have killed him during the fighting. He commanded a 2,400-man brigade at the Battle of Borghetto on 30 May and during the Siege of Mantua. When the siege was lifted on 1 August, he led 2,000 men from the garrison to reinforce the main army before the Battle of Castiglione. During the second attempt to relieve the Siege of Mantua, he joined Paul Davidovich's Tyrol Corps. He was badly injured in a fall the night before the Battle of Rovereto, which occurred on 4 September. Nevertheless, he led his brigade during the day's fighting. His troops bravely tried to stop Masséna's advance, but they were finally routed by superior numbers.

During the third attempt to relieve Mantua, Vukassovich participated in the Tyrol Corps' victories at Cembra on 2 November and the Battle of Calliano on 6–7 November. On the 17th, his troops battled their way out of the Adige River gorge to link up with Joseph Ocskay von Ocsko's column on the heights. Together they routed the French at Rivoli Veronese. After Bonaparte won the Battle of Arcole, the French army commander drove the Tyrol Corps back to Trento. During the fourth attempt to relieve Mantua, Jozsef Alvinczi directed Vukassovich to lead his 6th Column down the east bank of the Adige River. His artillery supported the attack of Prince Heinrich XV of Reuss-Plauen on the west bank of the river, but he exerted little other influence on the disastrous result of the Battle of Rivoli because his troops were on the wrong side of the river.

=== Second Coalition ===
Jean Serurier

Vukassovich served in Italy during the War of the Second Coalition. As the French were driven back by Austrians and Alexander Suvorov, Pyotr Bagration captured Brescia in a decisive move on 21 April 1799. Loss of Brescia compelled general Schérer to further retreat. The general, commanding the French forces, was replaced by Moreau, and new defensive positions were taken along the Adda River. Vukassovich surprised the French crossing the river at Brivio, while general Ott managed a crossing at Trezzo (see Battle of Cassano). On 28 April 1799, Vukassovich trapped Jean Sérurier and 3,000 French troops at Verderio. After a "sharp fight" Sérurier and his 2,700 surviving soldiers laid down their arms. Vukassovich then led the army's advance guard in the capture of numerous towns in northwest Italy. In July 1799, he became the proprietor of the newly formed (in 1798) Vukassovich Infantry Regiment # 48. The similarly numbered Schmidfeld Regiment had been disbanded in 1795. He would remain the regiment's proprietor until his death.

Promoted to Feldmarschall-Leutnant (lieutenant general) in October 1799, Vukassovich took part in the 1800 Italian campaign. When Bonaparte invaded Italy via the Great Saint Bernard Pass, he commanded a division farther east in the area of Lake Maggiore and Lake Como. On 25 May, a cavalry patrol of Vukassovich's scouts briefly captured Bonaparte before themselves becoming prisoners when the French general's escort appeared. The sudden French offensive drove Vukassovich's outnumbered troops out of Milan. Pursued by Guillaume Duhesme's French corps, he retreated to Brescia and Cremona with his remaining 4,000 men, missing the Battle of Marengo.

== Napoleonic Wars ==
=== 1805 ===
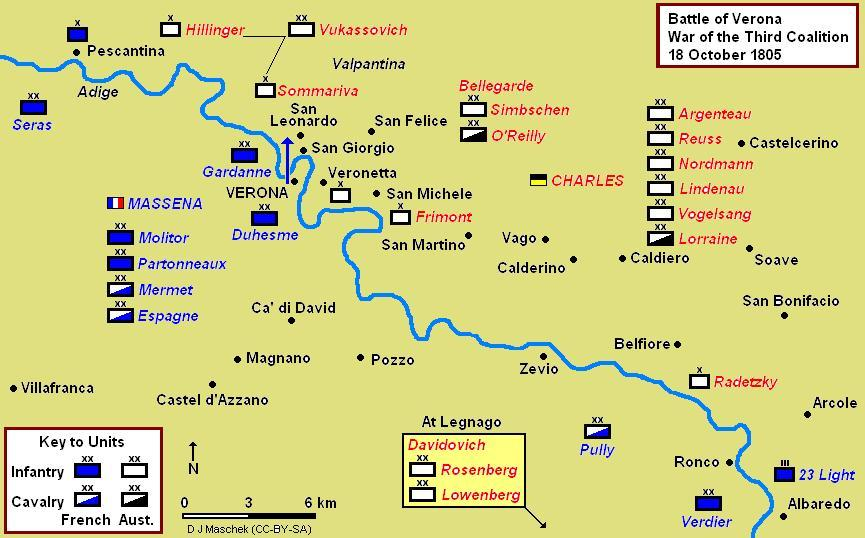
Battle of Verona on 18 October 1805. Vukassovich's position is at the upper left.

During the War of the Third Coalition, Vukassovich led a division in Archduke Charles' Army of Italy. His division consisted of 14 line and Grenz battalions and four squadrons organized into two brigades led by Hannibal Sommariva and Karl Hillinger. Tasked with guarding the east bank of the Adige opposite Verona and maintaining a link with Johann von Hiller's corps in the Tyrol, he garrisoned the suburb of San Giorgio with two battalions while holding six battalions farther back in the hills. The rest of his troops watched the river farther north.

In the Battle of Verona on 18 October 1805, André Masséna led the converged light companies of his army supported by two infantry divisions in an assault crossing of the river on Verona's west side. The French stormed across the Castelvecchio Bridge and quickly captured San Giorgio, but Vukassovich threw more infantry and cavalry into the struggle for the heights, which lasted most of the day. A French diversion at Pescantina occupied his right flank brigade, keeping it out of the fight. Meanwhile, a second diversion at Albaredo d'Adige fooled Charles into thinking it was the main attack. Only at the end of the day did Count Heinrich von Bellegarde appear with reinforcements, but it was too late to stop Masséna from establishing a bridgehead on the hills to the north of the city. Believing that Vukassovich held the riverbank with too few troops, archduke dismissed him from command and appointed Prince Franz Seraph of Rosenberg-Orsini as his replacement. Another account asserts that Vukassovich was sacked because he placed a number of cannons in an exposed position in violation of Charles' orders. At Verona, the Austrians suffered 1,622 casualties and loss of four cannons, while the French only lost about 450 killed and wounded.

=== 1809 ===
At the beginning of the War of the Fifth Coalition, Vukassovich commanded the III Armeekorps light division in Archduke Charles' main army in Bavaria. His two brigades were led by Moritz Liechtenstein and Josef Pfanzelter and included two Grenz and two Archduke Charles Legion battalions, plus two regiments of hussars and 22 artillery pieces.

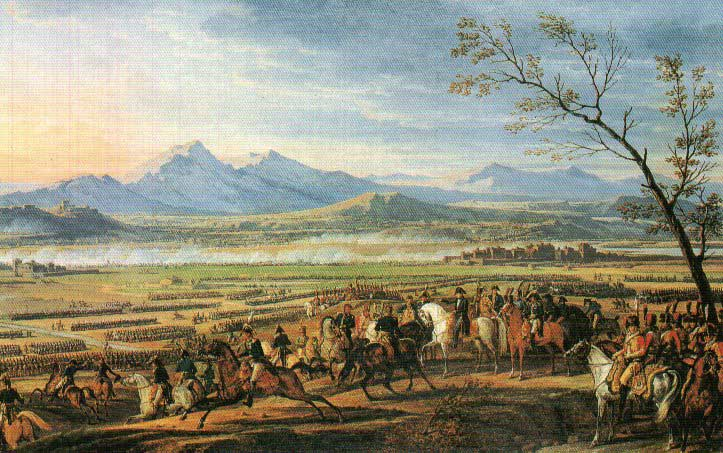
Battle of Wagram by Emil Adam. Vukassovich was fatally wounded in the Wagram bloodbath.

On the eve of the Battle of Teugen-Hausen, Vukassovich was instrumental in providing information about movement of Bavarian and French troops to Archduke Charles, including correspondence between marshals Lefebvre and Davout. Leading Prince Friedrich Hohenzollern's advance guard at the Battle of Teugen-Hausen on 19 April 1809, he drove the French advance elements out of Hausen and occupied a commanding ridge. When Marshal Louis Davout attacked, he conducted a stout defense with his troops and the reinforcements that arrived. He was wounded in the action, but continued to lead his troops in a battle notable for an unusual degree of front-line leadership by Austrian generals. On 21 April, his troops fought a rear guard action against Bavarian troops. His command formed the extreme left flank of the main body as Charles prepared to crush Davout on the morning of 22 April. His dispatch brought the first word to Charles that Napoleon was about to descend on the Austrian left flank. In the Battle of Eckmühl that day, Vukassovich "conducted his defense ably", holding off the French and Württembergers long enough for Prince Rosenberg's IV Armeekorps to deploy.

Vukassovich missed the Battle of Aspern-Essling, being involved in Johann Kollowrat's unsuccessful bid to cut Napoleon's supply line near Linz on 17 May. He commanded the center column in an attack on the fortified suburb of Urfahr on the north bank of the Danube. Kollowrat's "timid and badly coordinated" attack on the bridgehead failed. At the Battle of Wagram, he led one of two divisions in a reorganized III Armeekorps. On this occasion, he commanded the brigades of Joseph Grill (5,736 infantry), Andreas Schneller (1,100 infantry and 667 cavalry), and Emanuel Wratislaw (730 landwehr infantry). He was mortally wounded on 6 July, the second day of battle while defending against Jacques MacDonald's attack. He lingered for a month and finally died of his wounds in Vienna on 9 August 1809. He was one of four Austrian generals who were killed or fatally wounded at Wagram; the others were Konstantin Ghilian Karl d'Aspré, Peter von Vécsey, and Armand von Nordmann.

== Construction design works ==
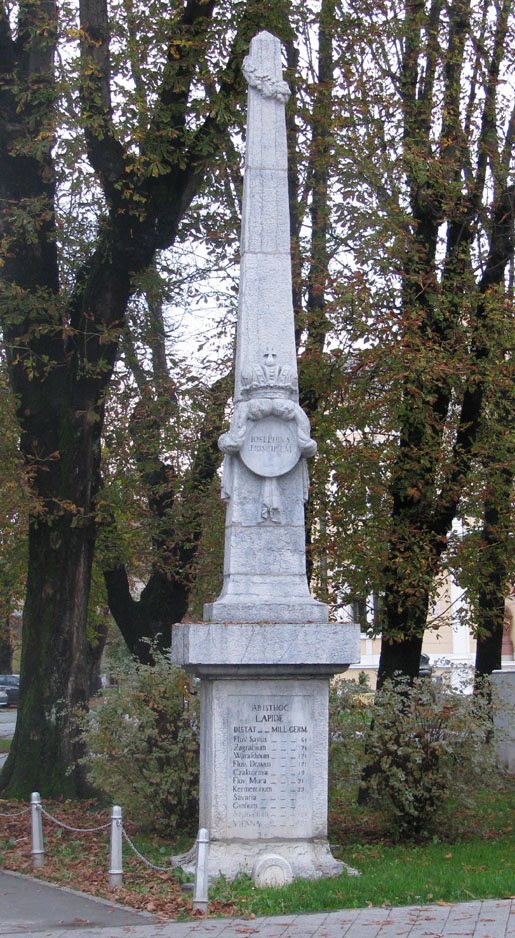
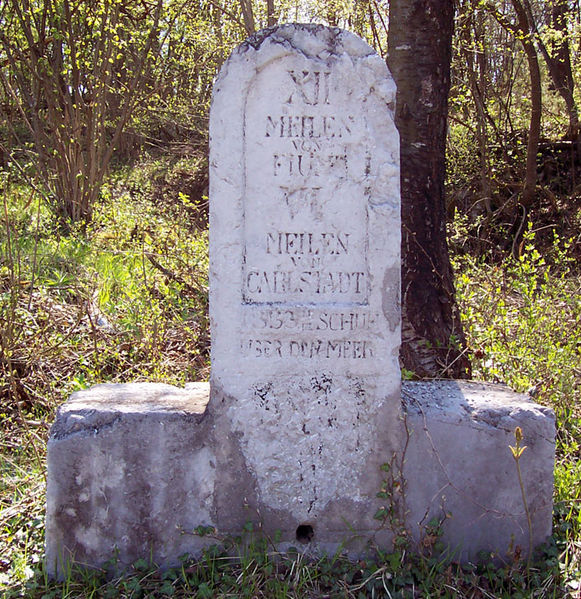
Via Josephina starting obelisk in Karlovac (left)
A milestone on Lujzijana near the village of Nadvučnik (right)

Vukassovich was instrumental in development of transport infrastructure in the present-day Croatian Littoral at the shores of the Adriatic Sea. His most significant contributions in the field were construction of roads after his designs. The first one was Gospić–Karlobag road, also known as Theresiana road, completed between 1784 and 1786—which replaced an earlier route which comprised very steep grades limiting its capacity. The new road permitted setting up of a free port in Karlobag and significantly improved connection to the seaward slopes of Velebit. Currently, the route largely corresponds to the western section of the D25 road. The other major route Vukassovich designed was the Louisiana road between Karlovac and Rijeka with a branch serving Bakar. The road was built between 1803 and 1811, and the route is now used by the D3 road. Vukassovich also designed a coastal road between Senj and Sveti Juraj, port structures in Senj, and directed reconstruction of the Josephina road leading from Senj to Karlovac.

== Annotations ==
1. His name is mostly attested as anglicized Philipp Vukassovich, or Philipp Freiherr Vukassovich, or Philipp von Vukassovich, and in English sources he is commonly referred to as General Vukassovich or Wukassowich. Croatian sources write his name Filip Vukasović. Some sources indicate his given name also included Joseph/Josef/Josip.

== Sources ==
Books

- Sir Alison, Archibald (1843). History of Europe from the commencement of the French revolution in 1789, to the restoration of the Bourbons in 1815. J. Winchester.
- Arnold, James R (1990). Crisis on the Danube: Napoleon's Austrian campaign of 1809. New York: Paragon House. ISBN 978-1-55778-137-6.
- Arnold, James R (2005). Marengo and Hohenlinden: Napoleon's rise to power. Barnsley, South Yorkshire: Pen & Sword Military. ISBN 978-1-84415-279-7.
- Arnold, James R (1995). Napoleon conquers Austria: the 1809 campaign for Vienna. Westport, Conn.: Greenwood Publishing Group. ISBN 978-0-275-94694-4.
- Bowden, Scotty; Tarbox, Charlie (1980). Armies on the Danube 1809. Arlington, Texas: Empire Games Press.
- Boycott-Brown, Martin (2001). The Road to Rivoli: Napoleon's First Campaign. London: Cassell & Co. ISBN 0-304-35305-1.
- Chandler, David G (1966). The Campaigns of Napoleon. New York: Macmillan.
- Fiebeger, G. J. (1911). The Campaigns of Napoleon Bonaparte of 1796–1797. West Point, New York: US Military Academy Printing Office.
- Fine, John Van Antwerp (2006). When Ethnicity Did Not Matter in the Balkans: A Study of Identity in Pre-Nationalist Croatia, Dalmatia, and Slavonia in the Medieval and Early-Modern Periods. Michigan: The University of Michigan Press. ISBN 0-472-11414-X.
- Hollins, David (2004). Austrian Commanders of the Napoleonic Wars 1792–1815. Oxford: Osprey Publishing Ltd. ISBN 1-84176-664-X.
- Horvat, Rudolf (1941). Lika i Krbava, povijesne slike, crtice i bilješke, svezak 1, opći dio [Lika and Krbava, historical portraits, sketches and notes, volume 1, general section] (in Croatian). Zagreb: Matica hrvatska.
- Kagan, Frederick W (2006). The End of the Old Order: Napoleon and Europe, 1801-1805. Cambridge: MA: Da Capo Press. ISBN 0-306-81137-5.
- Petre, F. Loraine (2003). Napoleon and the Archduke Charles. Kessinger Publishing. ISBN 9780766173859.
- Pivka, Otto von (1979). Armies of the Napoleonic Era. New York: Taplinger Publishing. ISBN 0-8008-5471-3.
- Rose, Hugh James, ed. (1848). A new general biographical dictionary, projected and partly arranged by H.J. Rose.
- Rothenberg, Gunther Erich (1982). Napoleon's great adversaries: the Archduke Charles and the Austrian Army, 1792-1814. Indiana University Press. ISBN 9780253339690.
- Schneid, Frederick C. (2002). Napoleon's Italian Campaigns: 1805-1815. Greenwood Publishing Group. ISBN 9780275968755.
- Smith, Digby George (1998). The Greenhill Napoleonic wars data book. London: Greenhill Books. ISBN 9781853672767.
- Tucker, Spencer C., ed. (2009). A Global Chronology of Conflict: From the Ancient World to the Modern Middle East: From the Ancient World to the Modern Middle East. ABC-CLIO. ISBN 9781851096725.
- Wilkes, John, ed. (1810). Encyclopaedia Londinensis. London.

Articles

- Kudrna, Leopold; Smith, Digby. "V24: Vukassovich, Joseph Philipp von". A Biographical Dictionary of All Austrian Generals during the French Revolutionary and Napoleonic Wars •1792–1815 (with Biographical Essays by Digby Smith). The Napoleon Series.
- Ljubović, Enver (December 2006). "Senjski Uskoci i plemići Vukasovići i njihovi grbovi" [Senj Uskoks and nobility of Vukasović and their arms]. The Review of Senj (in Croatian). 33 (1). City Museum Senj - Senj Museum Society: 63–77. ISSN 0582-673X.
- Millar, Stephen. "Austrian Infantry Regiments and Their Commanders 1792-1815: Line Infantry Regiments Nrs. 41 - 50". napoleon-series.org.

Military offices
Preceded by Johann Nepomuk Schmidfeld (Disbanded 1795. Reformed 1798)	Proprietor (Inhaber) of Infantry Regiment # 48; 1799–1809	Succeeded by Joseph Anton von Simbschen
