= Konstantin Ghilian Karl d'Aspré =

Austrian general

Konstantin Ghilian Karl d'Aspré von Hoobreuk
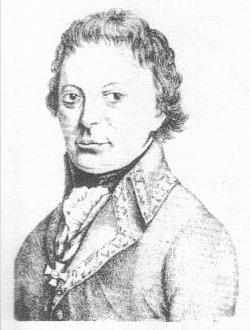
- Konstantin Ghilian Karl d'Aspré von Hoobreuk
- Born: 27 December 1754; Ghent, Austrian Netherlands, now Belgium
- Died: 8 July 1809 (aged 54) Mikulov (Nikolsburg), Habsburg Austria, now the Czech Republic
- Allegiance: (Habsburg monarchy) Habsburg Austria; Austrian Empire
- Branch: Infantry
- Rank: Feldmarschall-Leutnant
- Conflicts: Brabant Revolution; French Revolutionary Wars; Napoleonic Wars
- Awards: Military Order of Maria Theresa, KC 1790
- Other work: Inhaber Infantry Regiment Nr. 18

Konstantin Ghilian Karl d'Aspré von Hoobreuk (27 December 1754 – 8 July 1809), served in the army of Habsburg Austria during the French Revolutionary Wars. In the Napoleonic Wars, he made a mark in two major campaigns. In 1809, he was briefly Proprietor (Inhaber) of an infantry regiment and rose to command a division. His son Konstantin d'Aspré (1789–1850) also became an Austrian general.

D'Aspré helped put down the Brabant Revolution of 1789 and 1790 in his native land, and won a coveted award. During the War of the First Coalition he was promoted to command a regiment. He played an important role in one clash during the 1805 campaign. In 1809, he led a brigade of grenadiers in the early battles and later was appointed to command a grenadier division. He was mortally wounded while leading his soldiers at the Battle of Wagram.

== Early career ==
Born at Ghent in the Austrian Netherlands on 27 December 1754, d'Aspré made his career in the army. A son, also named Konstantin, was born on 18 December 1789 in Brussels. While a captain, the elder Konstantin performed with notable bravery in the Brabant Revolution and won the Knight's Cross of the Military Order of Maria Theresa on 19 December 1790. He fought during the War of the First Coalition, becoming Oberst in 1794.

At the Battle of Verona on 26 April 1799, the d'Aspré Jäger Corps of 10 companies was assigned to the brigade of Anton von Elsnitz in Konrad Valentin von Kaim's division. The Jäger Corps also fought at the Battle of Magnano on 6 April. D'Aspré was promoted General-major on 6 February 1800. He served under Peter Karl Ott von Bátorkéz in the operations leading up to the Siege of Genoa. Like other émigré officers, D'Aspré had an aggressive outlook. In one action, his fellow general Friedrich Heinrich von Gottesheim chided him for being so impatient. Gottesheim asked what good could be done by cavalry across the rough ground between them and the French and d'Aspré replied, "Beat them". On 7 April 1800, Nicolas Soult and 5,000 French soldiers launched a surprise attack on Monte Fascio. The French assault mauled Ott's division, forcing the 2nd Battalion of the Archduke Joseph Infantry Regiment Nr. 63 to surrender. For a loss of only 200 killed and wounded, Soult's men inflicted losses of 54 killed, 178 wounded, and 1,400 captured on the Austrians. D'Aspré was made a prisoner during the encounter.

== Napoleonic Wars ==
=== 1805 ===
D'Aspré received a command in the army of Archduke Ferdinand Karl Joseph of Austria-Este and Karl Mack von Lieberich at the beginning of the War of the Third Coalition. He led a brigade-sized unit of three and one-half infantry battalions and six cavalry squadrons. When the army of Emperor Napoleon I of France reached the Danube on 6 October, Mack realized that his army was in danger of being cut off from Vienna. At that time, he made the questionable decision to assemble the corps of Franz Jellacic, Franz von Werneck, and Karl Philipp, Prince of Schwarzenberg near Ulm, renouncing any idea of retreating south to the Tyrol. On 8 October, he issued orders for his army to concentrate at Günzburg downstream from Ulm. He hoped to put his troops in a position to sever Napoleon's supply line back to France. At this time, Napoleon was only vaguely aware of the Austrian army's position.

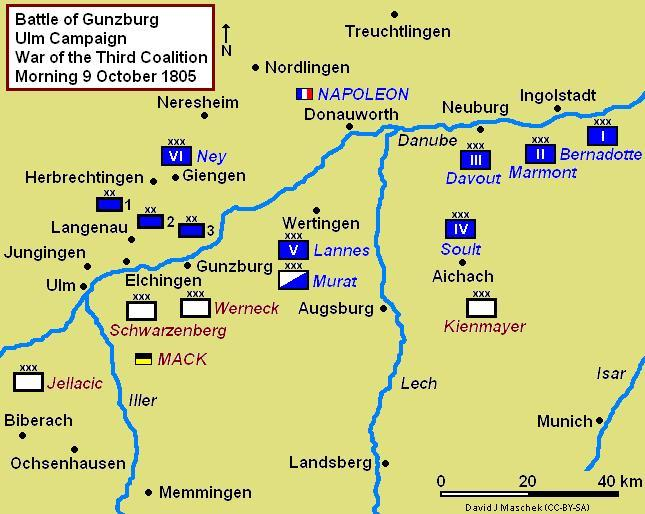
Battle of Gunzburg, 9 October 1805, where d'Aspré was captured

On 8 October, Marshals Joachim Murat and Jean Lannes encountered Franz Xavier Auffenberg's division at the Battle of Wertingen. The French crushed the outnumbered Austrians and drove the survivors west to Günzburg. The next day, Mack and Ferdinand drew up their troops facing east on the south bank of the Danube near Günzburg. Mack deployed d'Aspré and a light force that included Tyrolean Jägers to hold and scout the north bank. Unknown to Mack, Marshal Michel Ney sent one of his divisions to seize the Günzburg bridges from the north that morning.

Jean-Pierre Firmin Malher formed his 3rd Division of the VI Corps into three columns and marched south on 9 October. The western column blundered into a marsh, while the eastern column was badly delayed. The centre column marched straight for Günzburg and collided with d'Aspré's troops. As soon as the soldiers in Günzburg heard the firing, they immediately destroyed the bridges. Unfortunately, this left d'Aspré with the French in front of him and an unbridged river behind him. He surrendered with 200 Jägers and two cannons.

Warned by d'Aspré's scouting force, the Archduke Charles Infantry Regiment Nr. 3 and 20 cannons mounted a vigorous defence, bringing Mahler's attack to an abrupt halt at the river bank. At this point, Mack ordered Ignaz Gyulai to rebuild the bridge on the east side of town and cross to the north bank. Mack still dreamed of crossing the Danube and advancing on Giengen and Nördlingen. No sooner did Gyulai have the bridge ready, when the tardy western column appeared and captured the span, winning the battle for the French.

Mack later claimed that d'Aspré failed to report his contact with the French, though this may be an attempt at self-justification. Ney interrogated his prisoner d'Aspré and reported to Napoleon that the Austrian army was falling back to Biberach an der Riß. This was not true, but it is not clear whether d'Aspré deliberately misled his captor or if he was only guessing what Mack's intentions were. The campaign ended in disaster for Austria when Mack capitulated with 25,000 troops at Ulm on 20 October, Werneck surrendered his remaining 6,000 men on 18 October, and the 4,600-strong garrison of Memmingen also ran up the white flag. A total of almost 50,000 Austrians became prisoners in the fighting.

=== 1809 ===
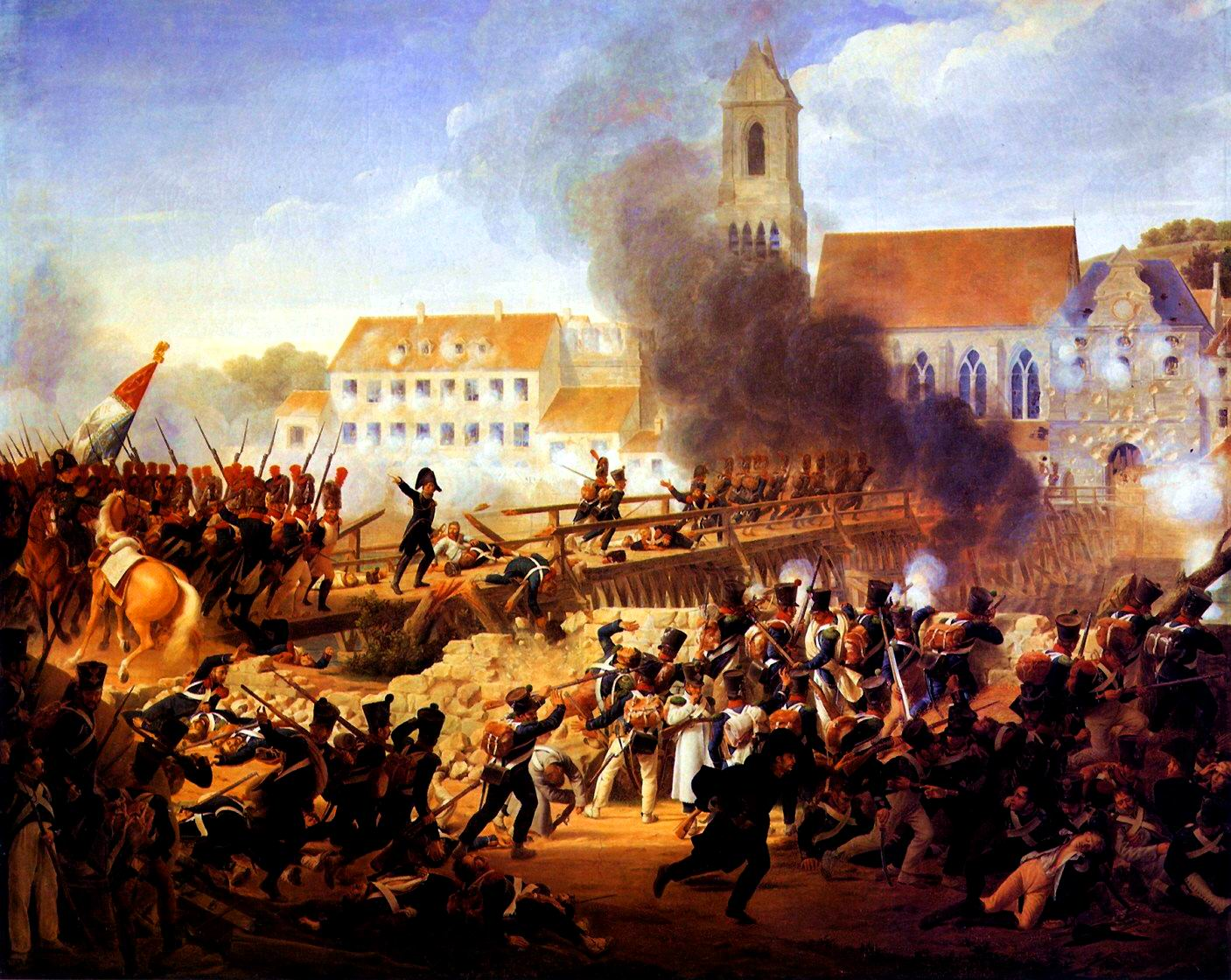
Battle of Landshut, 21 April 1809. Painting by Louis Hersent.

At the start of the War of the Fifth Coalition, d'Aspré led a brigade in Michael von Kienmayer's small II Reserve Armeekorps consisting of the Puteani, Brezeczinsky, Scovaud, Kirchenbetter, and Scharlach grenadier battalions, plus a battery of eight 6-pounder cannons. In the Battle of Abensberg on 20 April 1809, Archduke Louis of Austria tried unsuccessfully to defend the line of the Abens River. During the morning, Louis called up Kienmayer's corps from Ludmannsdorf to support Joseph Radetzky von Radetz's left flank brigade near Siegenburg. During the afternoon, d'Aspré's grenadiers supported Radetzky as he fell back toward Pfeffenhausen. At 11:00 PM that night, Bavarian pursuers aggressively crossed the Große Laber stream and attacked. Radetzky borrowed one of d'Aspré's grenadier battalions and held the Hornbach hill south of Pfeffenhausen until the early morning hours.

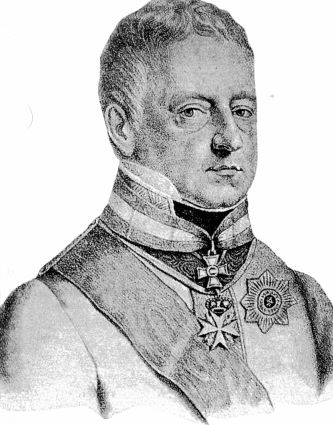
Michael von Kienmayer

On 21 April, Napoleon attacked Johann von Hiller in the Battle of Landshut but the Austrians managed to avoid being trapped. However, Hiller's left wing lost an estimated 9,000 casualties during the day. Three of d'Aspré's grenadier battalions formed the Austrian rear guard as they retreated to Neumarkt-Sankt Veit. D'Aspre was present at the Battle of Neumarkt-Sankt Veit on 24 April, when Hiller lashed out at his Bavarian and French pursuers. Kienmayer's force retreated through Braunau am Inn on 26 April. D'Aspré missed the hard-fought Battle of Ebelsberg on 3 May. Hiller unwisely sent Kienmayer's troops to Asten, even as the French were in the process of driving in his rear guards. Nevertheless, d'Aspré's promotion to Feldmarschall-Leutnant came through the next day.

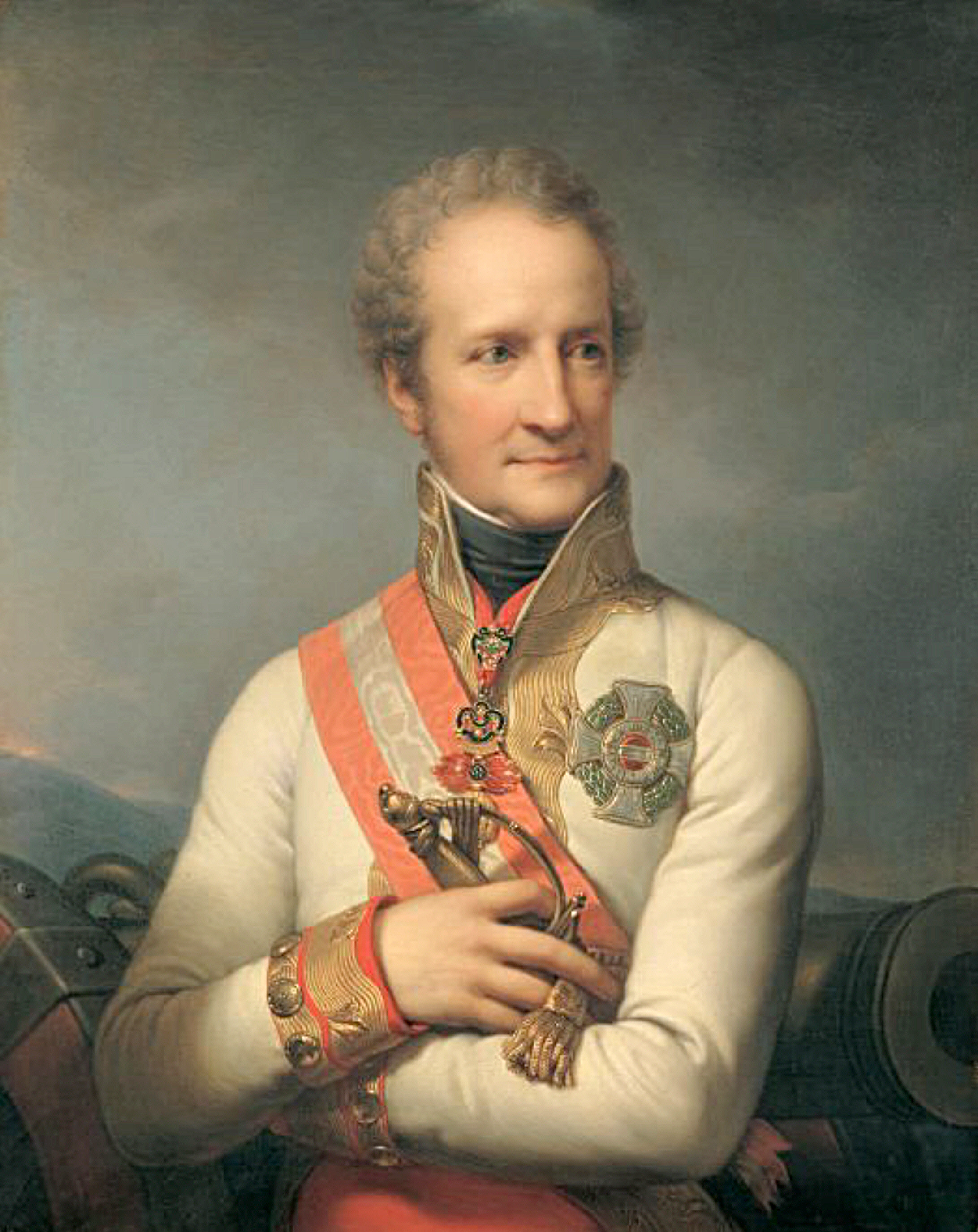
Prince Johann Liechtenstein

On 8 May, most of Hiller's wing, including Kienmayer's corps, crossed to the north bank of the Danube at Mautern an der Donau. Within a short time, d'Aspré's grenadiers crossed to the south bank again to assist in Archduke Maximilian of Austria-Este's short-lived defence of Vienna. Other defending forces were landwehr under Andreas O'Reilly von Ballinlough, a division led by Josef von Dedovich, and a brigade co-commanded by Armand von Nordmann and Joseph, Baron von Mesko de Felsö-Kubiny. At 3:00 AM on 12 April, d'Aspré led his five battalions in an attack on the French positions at the Lusthaus on Prater Island. The attack was repulsed by the defenders, but its real purpose was to cover the Austrian retreat to the north bank of the Danube, which was successfully carried out.

In mid-May, Archduke Charles, Duke of Teschen merged the II Reserve Armeekorps into the I Reserve Armeekorps under the leadership of Johann I Joseph, Prince of Liechtenstein. In the new organization, d'Aspré and Johann Nepomuk von Prochaska became the two infantry division commanders. D'Aspré's division comprised the five battalions from his former brigade plus the Bissingen, Oklopsin, and Mayblümel grenadier battalions. The 5,362 elite infantry were divided into two 4-battalion brigades under Franz Mauroy de Merville and Anton von Hammer, and included a brigade battery of six 6-pounder cannons.

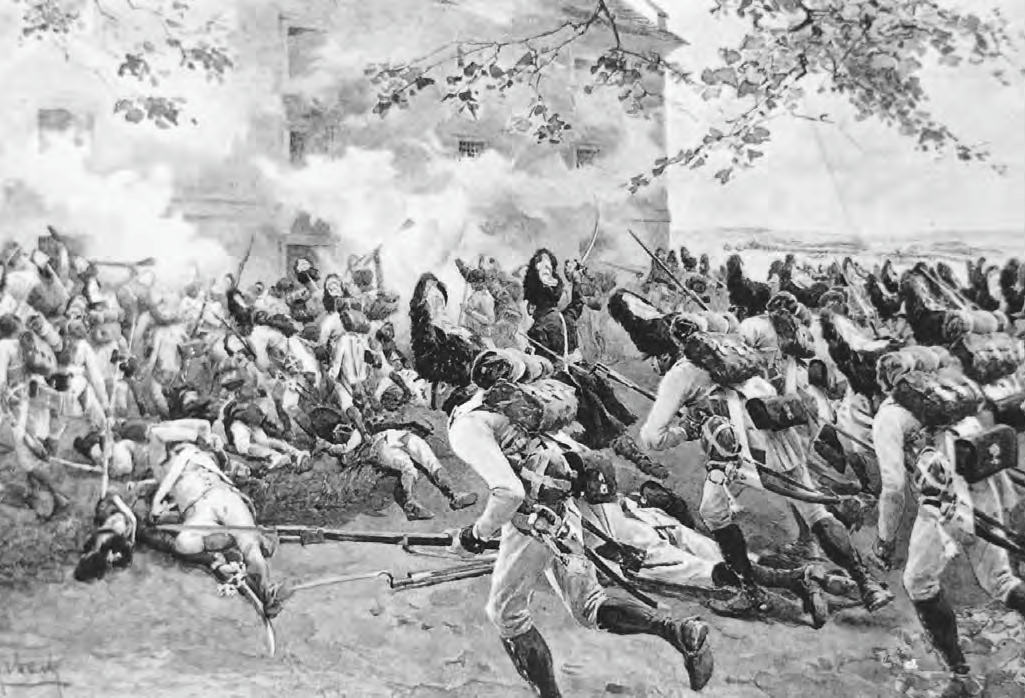
Merville's grenadier brigade of d'Aspré's division storms Essling. Painting by Felician Myrbach.

On 21 May, the first day of the Battle of Aspern-Essling, the grenadier reserve was not committed to combat. The next day, Napoleon tried to break out of the narrow bridgehead by sending Marshal Jean Lannes with three divisions to assault the weak Austrian centre. In the crisis, Archduke Charles moved d'Aspré's and Prochaska's grenadier divisions (under Kienmayer) to block Lannes. When the troops showed unsteadiness, Charles personally waved the colours of the grenadiers of the Zach Infantry Regiment Nr. 15 to rally his troops. This greatly heartened the defenders, and the French assault was defeated when reinforcements arrived from the right and left flanks. In the afternoon, Charles ordered Merville's brigade from d'Aspré's division to attack Essling, which had held out against repeated assaults. The grenadiers routed the French from the village, except for the fortress-like granary which held out. Later, five battalions of the Imperial Guard recaptured Essling.

On 24 May, the emperor appointed d'Aspré Proprietor (Inhaber) of the Infantry Regiment Nr. 18. Unfortunately, the general was not destined to enjoy this honour for very long. D'Aspré's division maintained the same organization for the Battle of Wagram on 5 and 6 July, except that the Mayblümel battalion was renamed Locher. Also, two 6-pounder and one 3-pounder brigade batteries were attached, with a total strength of 24 cannons. On the night of the 4th, Napoleon launched a massive amphibious assault from Lobau Island to the north bank of the Danube, forcing back the Austrian VI Armeekorps and Advance Guard. At 6:00 PM that afternoon, Napoleon sent Nicolas Oudinot's II Corps, Eugène de Beauharnais' Army of Italy, and Jean-Baptiste Bernadotte's IX Saxon Corps to break Archduke Charles' line near Wagram. After initially being driven back, the Austrian I and II Armeekorps counterattacked and routed the Franco-Allied forces.

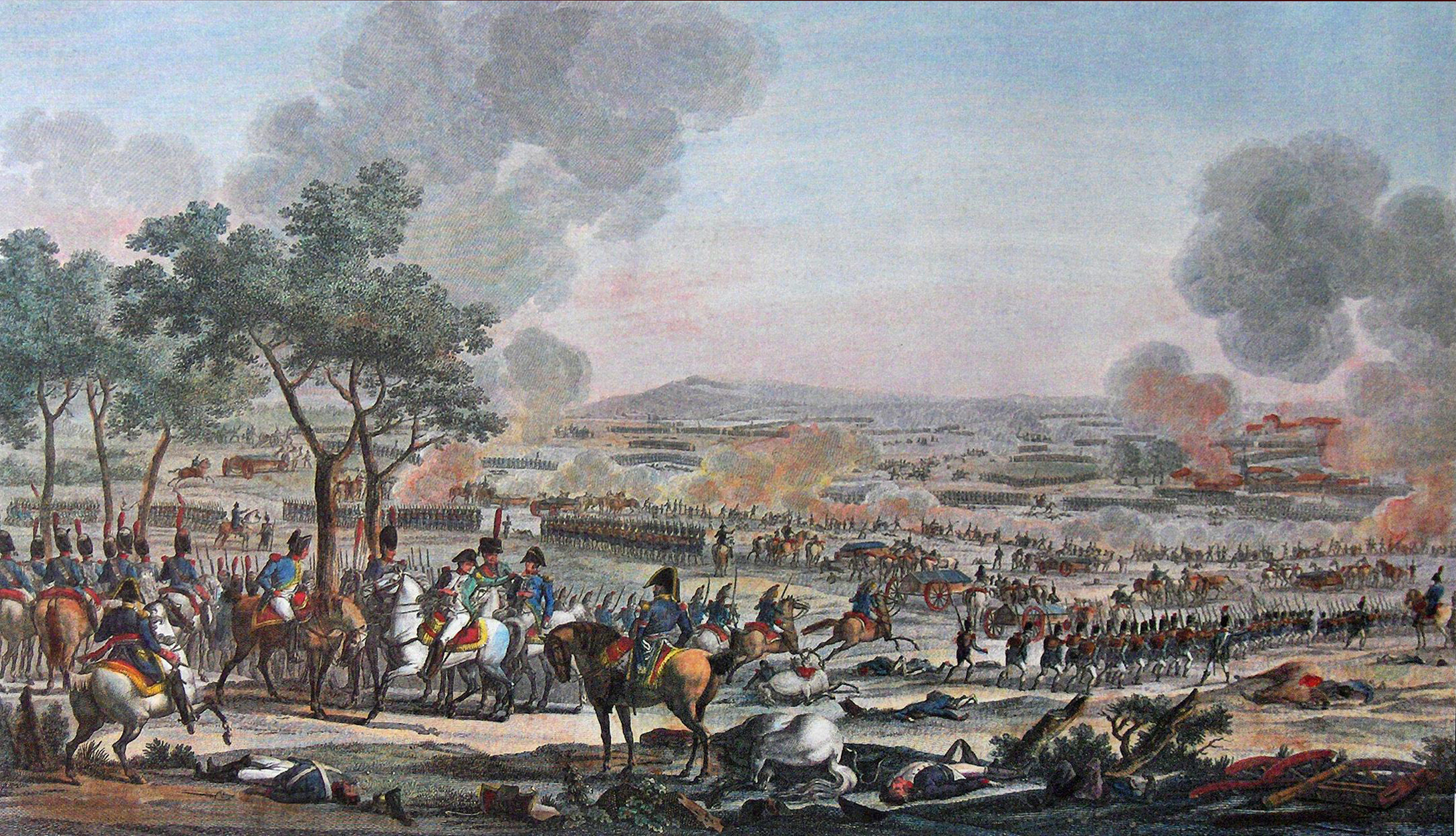
D'Aspré was mortally wounded at the Battle of Wagram. Painting by Carle Vernet.

For the 6th, Archduke Charles planned to envelop both of Napoleon's flanks. At 4:00 AM, Prince Franz Seraph of Rosenberg-Orsini's IV Armeekorps and Nordmann's Advance Guard attacked the French right flank. Meanwhile, Johann von Klenau's VI Armeekorps and Johann Kollowrat's III Armeekorps marched against the French left. Charles intended for Liechtenstein's I Reserve, Heinrich, Count of Bellegarde's I Armeekorps, and Prince Friedrich Franz Xaver of Hohenzollern-Hechingen's II Armeekorps to support the attack of the right wing. Napoleon planned for Louis Davout's III Corps to crush Rosenberg's left flank and roll up the Austrian line.

Rosenberg's early morning attack quickly failed against Davout's defences. Believing his position in the centre badly exposed, Bernadotte defied his orders and evacuated Aderklaa, a village located southwest of Wagram. After Bellegarde occupied the village, a furious Napoleon ordered its immediate recapture by Bernadotte's Saxons and André Masséna's IV Corps. The Saxons ran into an intense artillery barrage and ran away, but Claude Carra Saint-Cyr's division retook Aderklaa. On the Austrian side, Charles was compelled to send in the two grenadier divisions to support Bellegarde's troops in the see-saw contest for Aderklaa. The Austrians managed to recapture Aderklaa, but Gabriel Jean Joseph Molitor's division soon counterattacked. After brutal fighting, Molitor was forced to leave the village in Austrian hands.

Early in the afternoon, Napoleon ordered Jacques MacDonald's 8,000 men to attack the Austrian centre. Forming his three weak divisions into a hollow square, MacDonald led his soldiers forward at the boundary between the Austrian Reserve and III Armeekorps. The French smashed into their adversaries' front, but the Austrian formations on the flanks held firm, preventing a breakthrough. Seeing MacDonald's attack stall, Napoleon sent his reserves to help. In order to halt the French attack, one Austrian grenadier brigade had wheeled to face the northern side of the square. The reinforcements took the brigade in flank and drove it back in confusion to Aderklaa, where it attempted to hold out. D'Aspré tried to rally his men but suffered a fatal wound. After the fall of their leader, his men abandoned the position. When the army retreated north after the battle, the stricken general was taken along and he died on 8 July at Mikulov (Nikolsburg) in what is now the Czech Republic. He was one of four Austrian generals killed or mortally wounded at Wagram. The others were Josef Philipp Vukassovich, Peter von Vécsey, and Nordmann.

Like his father, his son Konstantin went on to become an Austrian general, fighting at the Battle of Novara in 1849 and dying in 1850.

== Notes ==
Military offices
Preceded by Patrick Stuart	Proprietor (Inhaber) of Infantry Regiment Nr 18; 1809	Succeeded by Prince Heinrich XIII of Reuss-Greiz
