= Otto Ludwig von Stutterheim =

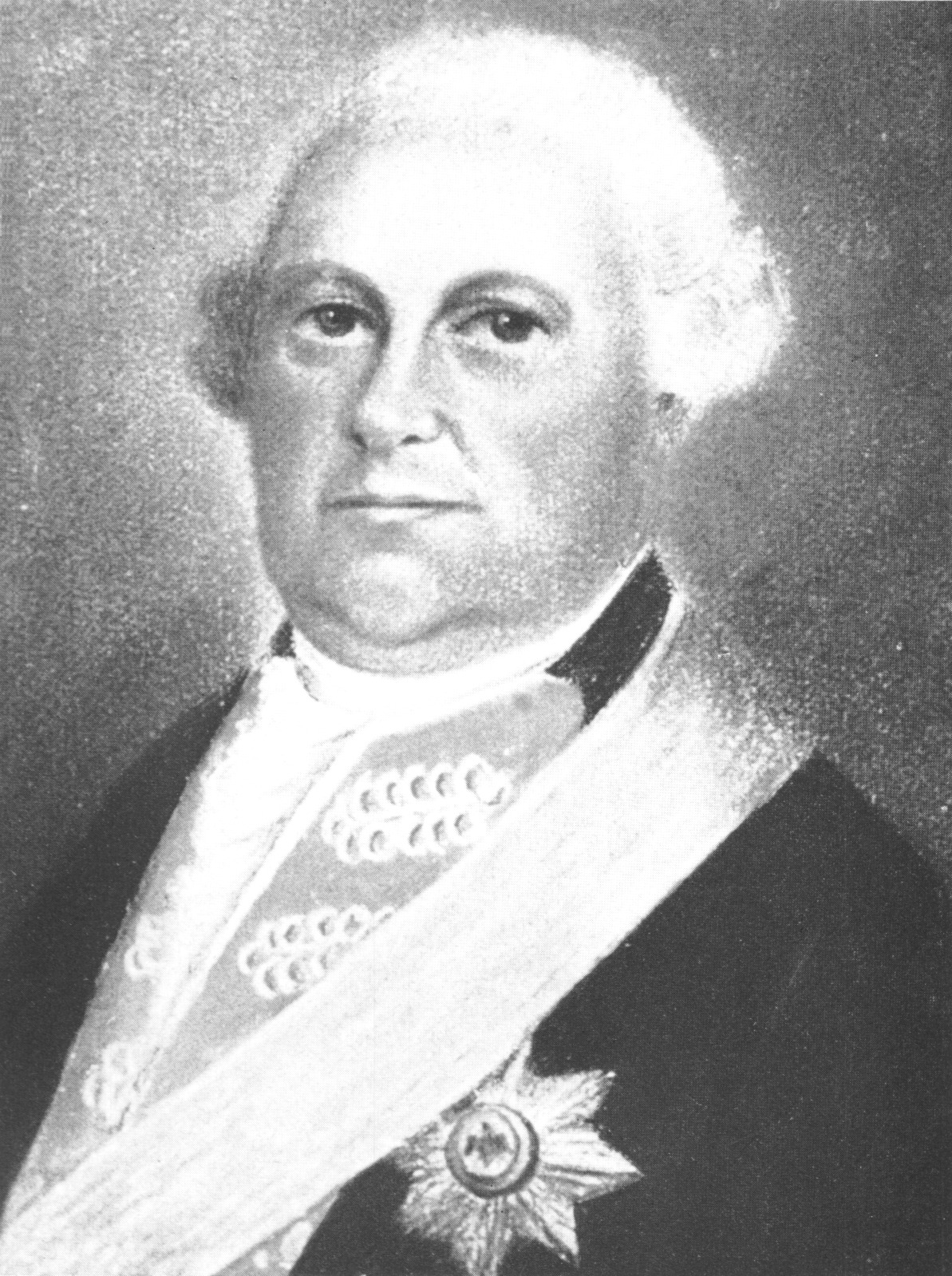
- Young Stutterheim
- Born: 2 November 1718; Sellendorf, Lower Lusatia
- Died: 26 August 1783 (aged 64)
- Allegiance: (Kingdom of Prussia) Prussia
- Service years: 1732–1783
- Rank: General of Infantry
- Conflicts: War of the Austrian Succession; Seven Years' War; War of Bavarian Succession
- Awards: Pour le Mérite; Order of the Black Eagle All his honors were reversed upon his retirement

Otto Ludwig von Stutterheim (1718–1780), also called the Young Stutterheim, was a younger brother of General Joachim Friedrich von Stutterheim. He led a relatively uneventful career overshadowed by his successful and talented brother until mid-way through the Seven Years' War. At that point, losses in the general staff forced Frederick the Great to dig deeper into the talent pool to replace his general staff, who were dying of old age, in battle, or simply to sick to carry on. At one point tapped to replace the aging and ailing Field Marshal Hans von Lehwaldt, he alienated the King; in 1778, immediately prior to the outbreak of the War of Bavarian Succession, a chance comment by Stutterheim on the pending hostilities got him into trouble with the King. He was relieved of his dignities and honors and sent to his estate in retirement.

== Family ==
He was born 2 November 1718 on the paternal estate Sellendorf in the Lower Lusatia. His parents were Joachim Friedrich von Stutterheim (1683–1745) and Johanne Eleonore von Hacke (1687–1737). His father was a captain in the Polish-Saxon army, and a landowner. His brother, Joachim Friedrich (1715–1783), was also a Prussian lieutenant general, as was his nephew, Ludwig August von Stutterheim.

== Military career ==
Young Stutterheim entered the Prussian infantry at the age of fourteen. King Frederick took him into his retinue, appointed him as a lieutenant-in-chief in May 1757, and sent him to East Prussia on the 6 September, to support the Field Marshal Hans von Lehwaldt, who was standing there against the Russians. After the Battle of Gross-Jägersdorf on 30 August, the aging and ill Lehwaldt had asked that the King send him somebody "either to take command of the corps or to assist him." The King sent Stutterheim. At that time (early 1758), the king wrote to Christoph von Dohna, the second in command, who had to replace the old Lehwaldt, to use Stutterheim as a middleman to influence Lehwaldt, but soon Stutterheim managed to irritate the King, Lehwaldt and Dohna. As early as the 4 March, Frederick sent a very unfriendly letter castigating Stutterheim for not sending enough information, and for not acting as he was ordered. The latter accusation was based on the fact that, according to the King's opinion, the Mecklenburg Duchy was not producing enough recruits; this complaint formed the central theme in the King's complaints about Stutterheim's defects for the remainder of the war.

Despite this, in 1758 Frederick promoted Stutterheim to colonel and, on 26 February 1759, to major general. On the latter occasion he wrote that he was satisfied with Stutterheim's report on the deliveries of recruits, and hoped that this was the case, and that the Stutterheim should be worthy of advancement. In April 1759 Frederick made Stutterheim Chief of the completed Bornstedt Infantry Regiment Nr. 20.

Frederick's pleasure with Stutterheim was short-lived, and revived to be continued throughout the war. Lieutenant Heinrich von Manteuffel, who then commanded against the Swedes in Pomerania, must have had a better opinion of Stutterheim; he asked for him as commander of his infantry, and the King replied that he should have him, but that Manteuffel should not count on him too much. When, on 28 January 1760, Manteuffel fell into Swedish captivity at Anklam, Stutterheim assumed command. The Russians began their movements against Prussia the middle of August; Stutterheim kept retreating further west toward the Prussian border, much to Frederick's annoyance. The more enterprising Wilhelm Sebastian von Belling had greater success against the same adversaries and managed to hold them at bay for a while until strategic necessities of maintaining communication between both forces required him to retreat. Stutterheim kept his command only because Prince Henry, who was instructed to send someone to relieve Stutterheim, declared that he could not dispense with any of his good generals.

At the conclusion of the war, Stutterheim managed to stay out of the King's line of sight. On 24 August 1767, Stutterheim was promoted to the rank of lieutenant general, and in January 1773, he received the Order of the Black Eagle.

However, immediately before War of Bavarian Succession, he was completely disgraced. On a visit in Potsdam, in 1778, he allowed himself to comment on the imminent war; the King heard about it and, when Stutterheim asked for his retirement, he received it but, at the same time, the King withdrew his dignities and honors. Stutterheim retired to his estate at Kloster Mansfeld and died there on 29 March 1780.

Military offices
Preceded by August Gottlieb von Bornstedt	Proprietor of Infantry Regiment Nr. 20; 1759–1778	Succeeded by Christoph Wilhelm von Kalckstein
