= Peter Vecsey =

Peter Vecsey may refer to:

- Peter von Vécsey (died 1809), Austrian Imperial baron and general officer
- Peter Vecsey (sports columnist) (born 1943), American sports columnist
