= Peter von Vécsey =

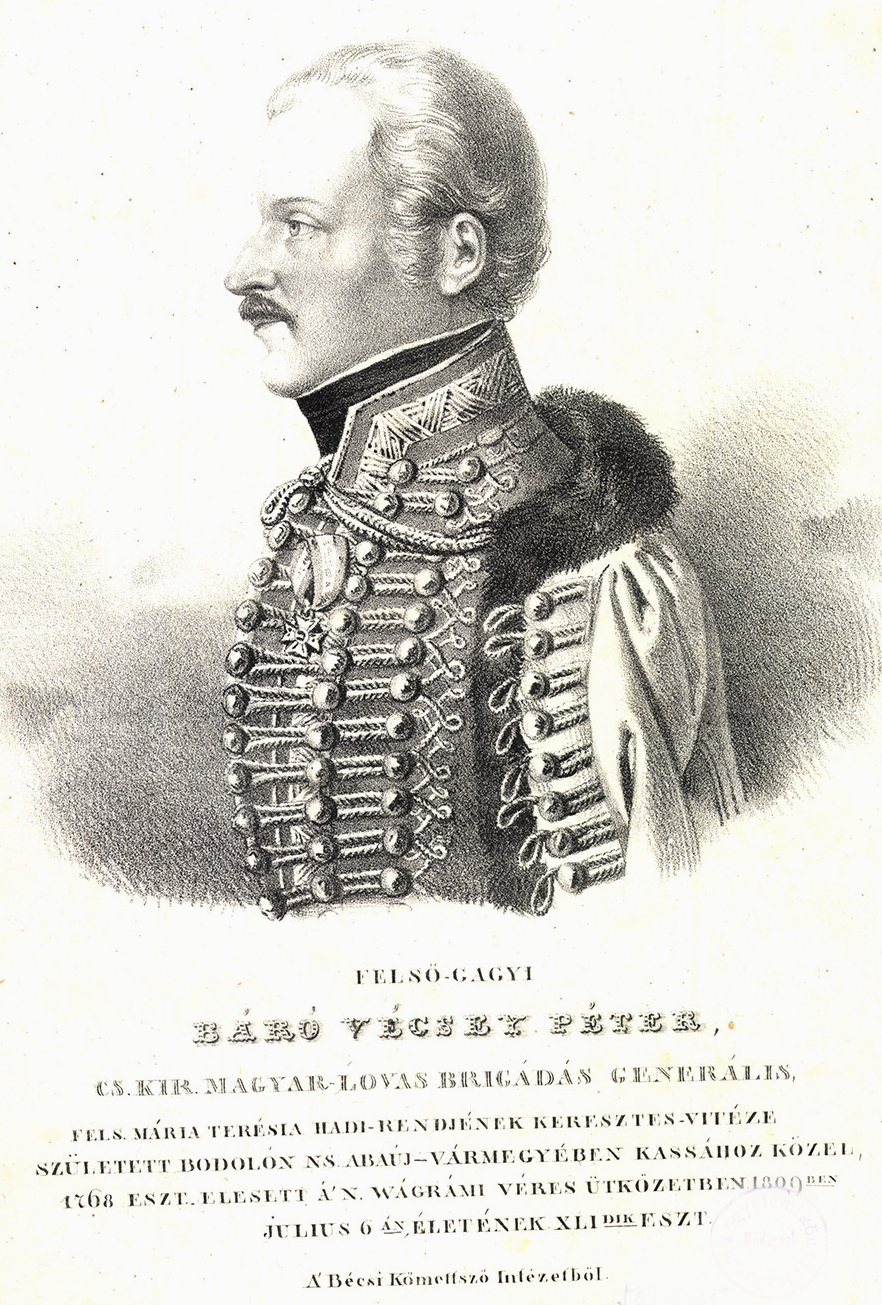
- Peter von Vécsey
- Born: 13 July 1768; Bodolló, Abaúj County, Hungary
- Died: 21 July 1809 (aged 41) Mikulov (Nikolsburg), Austrian Empire, modern-day Czech Republic
- Allegiance: Habsburg Monarchy; Austrian Empire
- Branch: Cavalry
- Service years: 1785–1809
- Rank: Generalmajor
- Conflicts: French Revolutionary Wars; Napoleonic Wars
- Awards: Military Order of Maria Theresa
- Other work: Freiherr

Peter, Freiherr von Vécsey or Peter Vécsey de Hernádvécse et Hajnácskeő (Hungarian: hernádvécsei és hajnácskeői gróf Vécsey Péter; 13 July 1768 – 21 July 1809) was an Imperial Austrian military commander of Hungarian descent who took part in the French Revolutionary Wars and Napoleonic Wars. As a Freiherr (Baron), he was a member of the Austrian landless nobility. He made his mark while leading cavalry units and advanced in rank to become a general officer in 1808. He led an independent brigade during part of the 1809 campaign, and was mortally wounded while leading his troops in battle.

== Early career ==
Peter Vécsey de Hernádvécse et Hajnácskeő was born into a military family on 13 July 1768 at Bodolló, Abaúj County in the Kingdom of Hungary. Having joined the army at age 17, Vécsey served in the Austrian cavalry. As a Rittmeister, he served in the Kaiser Chevauleger Regiment Nr. 1 during the War of the First Coalition, leading 15 troopers in a notable action on 25 August 1796, in which he captured a large number of French prisoners. He was also involved in a brilliant action at the Battle of Riegel on 20 October that year, when he led a charge that captured an enemy outpost, with its defending infantry and two guns. After being wounded in this action, he received the Military Order of Maria Theresa as well as the noble title of Freiherr. A relative, Feldmarschallleutnant Siegbert Vécsey de Hernádvécse et Hajnácskeő (1739–1802) was the Proprietor of Vécsey Hussar Regiment Nr. 34 (later Nr. 4) from 1791 until his death.

== Napoleonic Wars ==
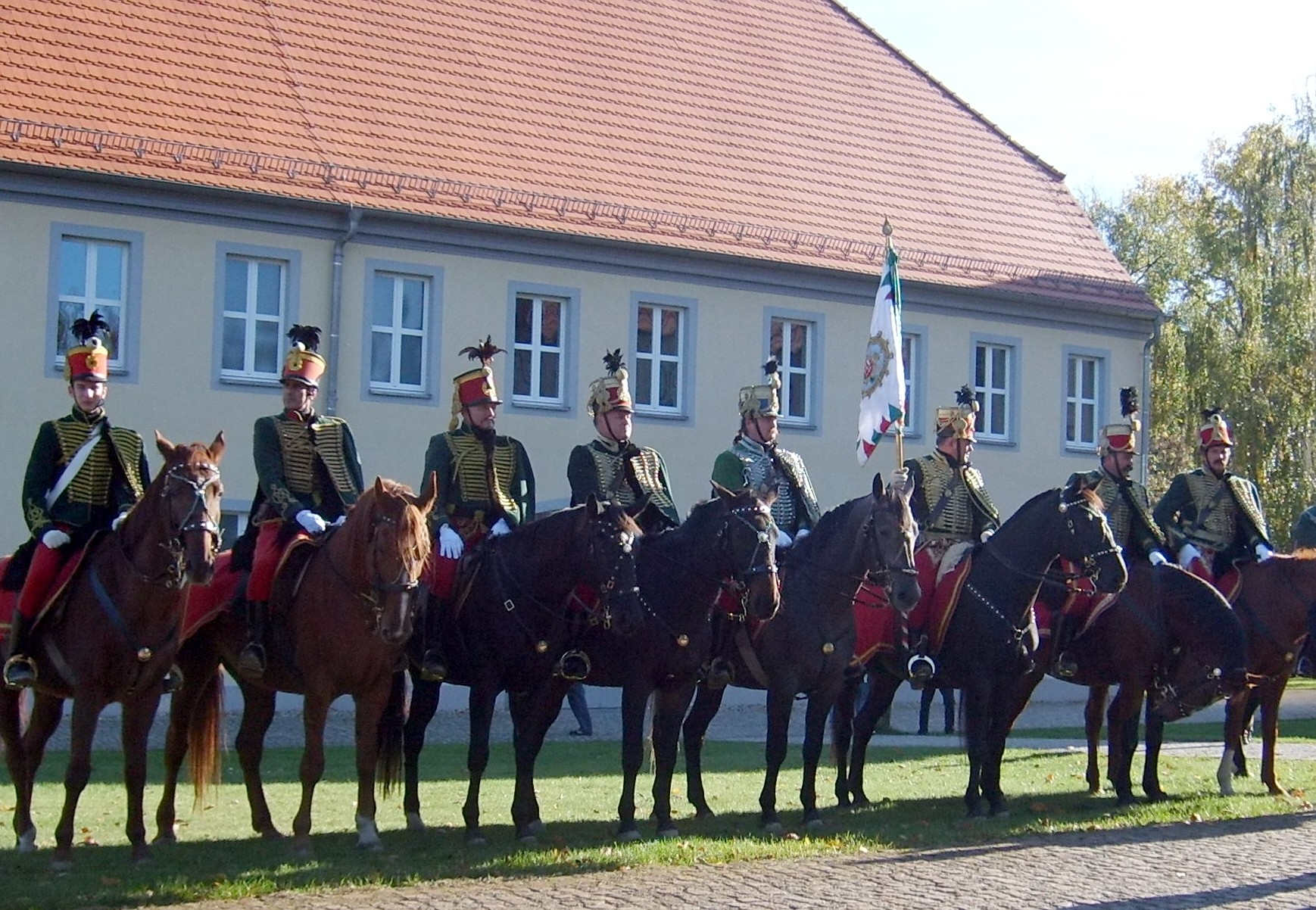
Reenactors wearing a Hungarian uniform from 1840 to 1848, possibly Hussar Regiment Nr. 5

Vécsey became renowned for leading from the front. He became Oberst (Colonel) of the Archduke Ferdinand Hussar Regiment Nr. 3, which he led at the Battle of Caldiero on 29–31 October 1805 during the War of the Third Coalition. On 14 August 1808 he was promoted to General-major. In 1809 during the War of the Fifth Coalition, he was given command of a brigade in the Austrian II Armeekorps, which was led by Feldzeugmeister Johann Kollowrat. His brigade included the 7th and 8th Jäger Battalions, the 2nd Battalion of the Archduke Charles Legion, the Klenau Chevauleger Regiment Nr. 5, and a brigade battery with eight 3-pound cannons. The division commander was Feldmarschallleutnant Johann von Klenau. At the beginning of the campaign, his brigade was detached from its army corps and served as an independent link between the I and II Armeekorps north of the Danube and the III, IV, V, VI, I Reserve, and II Reserve Armeekorps south of the river. The brigade operated on the south bank.

At the Battle of Aspern-Essling on 21 and 22 May 1809, Vécsey led a cavalry brigade consisting of the Vincent Chevauleger Regiment Nr. 4 and the Klenau Chevaulegers. His division commander was Feldmarschallleutnant Michael von Kienmayer. At the Battle of Wagram on 5 and 6 July, he commanded a brigade in Feldmarschallleutnant Armand von Nordmann's Advance Guard. His unit was made up of the Wallach-Illyrian Grenz Infantry Regiment Nr. 13, the Hessen-Homburg Hussars Nr. 4, and six 6-pound guns of a cavalry battery. He was fatally wounded leading his men during the second day of the battle. He died at Mikulov (Nikolsburg) in Bohemia on 21 July 1809, having never married. Vécsey was one of four Austrian generals slain or mortally wounded at Wagram, the others being Feldmarschallleutnants Josef Philipp Vukassovich, Konstantin Ghilian Karl d'Aspré, and Nordmann. He was the nephew of General-Major Stephan Vécsey de Vécse et Hajnácskeö (1719–1802), a veteran of the Seven Years' War. Another relative, General-Major August Vécsey de Hernádvécse et Hajnácskeő also led a brigade at Wagram.
