= Armand von Nordmann =

French and Austrian general (1759–1809)

- Born: 31 August 1759; Molsheim, France
- Died: 6 July 1809 (aged 49); Wagram, Austria
- Military career
- Allegiance: Kingdom of France; Austrian Empire
- Branch: Cavalry
- Rank: Feldmarschall-Leutnant
- Conflicts: French Revolutionary Wars; Napoleonic Wars
- Awards: Military Order of Maria Theresa, KC 1806

Joseph-Armand Ritter von Nordmann (31 August 1759 – 6 July 1809), was a French officer in the French Royal Army. He transferred his allegiance to Habsburg Austria during the French Revolution, like other French émigrés. In Austrian service he fought capably against his former country during the French Revolutionary Wars and the Napoleonic Wars.

A colonel in the French army, he defected to the Coalition forces in 1793. After fighting in one of the émigré armies, he became an Austrian officer in 1798. After commanding a cavalry regiment for several years, he was elevated in rank to general officer. He led a division in 1805, even though by rank he was a brigadier. From the start of the 1809 war, he was entrusted with small independent scouting forces and rear guards. He was promoted again to lead a corps-sized force shortly before he was killed at the Battle of Wagram.

== French Revolutionary Wars ==
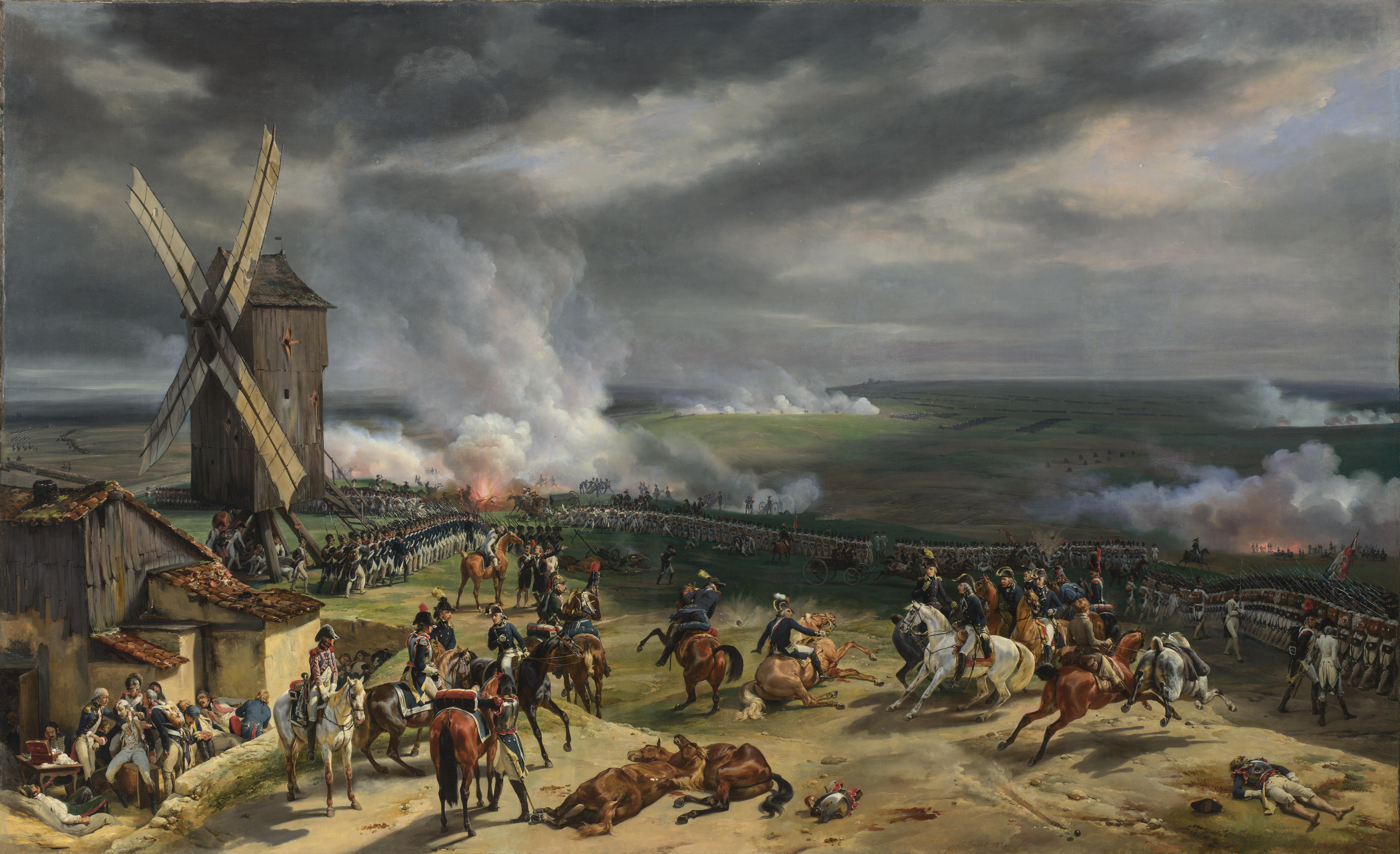
Nordmann switched sides a few months after the Battle of Valmy.

Born at Molsheim in Alsace on 31 August 1759, Nordmann joined the French Army of the Old Regime. After the outbreak of the French Revolution, he remained in the army and rose in rank to become colonel of the Bercheny (or Berczeny) Hussar Regiment. He fought under Charles François Dumouriez and François Christophe Kellermann at the Battle of Valmy on 20 September 1792. In early 1793, he defected to the Austrians with two squadrons of his regiment. Afterward, he led the cavalry of the émigré Bourbon Legion in Germany until the end of the War of the First Coalition in 1797. Napoleon Bonaparte always called Nordmann the "Alsatian traitor".

In 1798 Nordmann was appointed to the rank of Oberstleutnant in the Habsburg service. When the War of the Second Coalition broke out, he fought at the First Battle of Stockach on 25 March 1799 and at Andelfingen in May. On 17 March 1800, he received promotion to Oberst of the Latour Dragoon Regiment # 11. In May he led his regiment at the battles of Second Stockach and Messkirch. He performed notable service in action at Neuburg an der Donau on 27 June. After the end of the armistice, he fought at the Battle of Ampfing on 1 December 1800. Two days later, he commanded his cavalrymen at the Battle of Hohenlinden in Paul Esterházy's brigade of Prince Friedrich Karl Wilhelm Hohenlohe-Ingelfingen's division in Ludwig Baillet de Latour-Merlemont's Right Center column. During the retreat after Hohenlinden, the Latour Regiment fought at Salzburg on 14 December and Schwanenstadt on the 16th.

== Napoleonic Wars ==
=== 1805 campaign ===
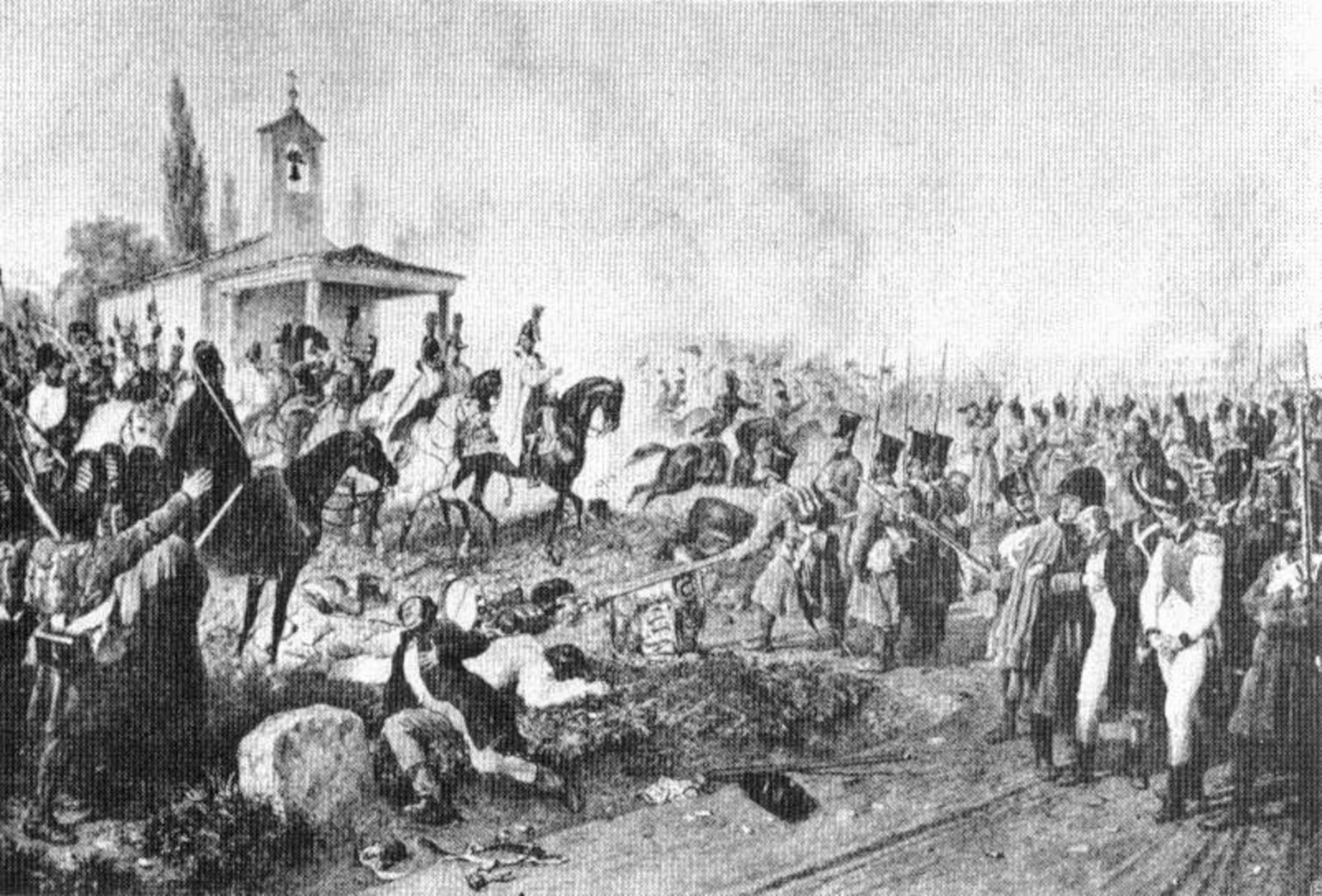
Nordmann led a division at the Battle of Caldiero.

On 1 September 1804, Nordmann became an Austrian General-Major. In the War of the Third Coalition, he served in the Armee von Italien of Archduke Charles, Duke of Teschen. Though only a General-Major, he was appointed to lead a division composed of his own brigade and Franz Anthony von Siegenfeld's brigade. His command included six Grenz infantry battalions and eight squadrons of the Erdödy Hussar Regiment # 9.

At the Battle of Caldiero, Charles posted Nordmann's 4,000 infantry and 800 cavalry on the far left flank near Belfiore. Early on the foggy morning of 30 October 1805, the 62nd Line Infantry Regiment belonging to Jean-Antoine Verdier's French division crossed the Adige River and pushed back Nordmann's front line brigade. He first threw in the Erdödy Hussars to slow down the French advance, but the horsemen were repulsed. When he ordered Siegenfeld's brigade into the fight supported by a violent artillery barrage, the 62nd was stopped. Since Verdier was unable to reinforce the 62nd because of Paul Davidovich's threat from the south, the French regiment withdrew. The next day, Verdier got his entire division across the Adige at Zevio. At noon, the French general's right flank brigade under Antoine Digonet assaulted Nordmann's positions. Nordmann counterattacked, driving Digonet back, though he was wounded during the action. Prince Heinrich XV of Reuss-Plauen defeated Verdier's other brigade under Jacques Brun and came dangerously close to forcing the French into the river. Verdier rallied his troops in time to stop the Austrians, but the inconclusive battle was over. On 28 May 1806, Nordmann received the Knight's Cross of the Military Order of Maria Theresa, giving him the title of 'Ritter von Nordmann.

=== 1809 campaign ===
In April and May 1809, Nordmann fought under Johann Hiller, shown here.

At the start of the War of the Fifth Coalition, Nordmann was appointed to lead a brigade in Karl von Vincent's division of Johann von Hiller's VI Armeekorps. His brigade included the Saint George Grenz Infantry Regiment # 6, Rosenberg Chevau-léger Regiment # 6, Liechtenstein Hussar Regiment # 7, a 3-pounder Grenz brigade battery (eight guns), and a 6-pounder cavalry battery (six guns). Hiller immediately detached Nordmann to observe the approach of André Masséna's corps, while he took the VI Armeekorps north to Mainburg on 19 April 1809. While Hiller's left wing was being defeated at the Battle of Abensberg on 20 April, Masséna's advance forced Nordmann's brigade back to Moosburg an der Isar. The next day, as Hiller suffered another rout at the Battle of Landshut, Nordmann was pressed back to Landshut along the east bank of the Isar River by the French.

Nordmann's brigade fought at the Battle of Neumarkt-Sankt Veit on 24 April. During the subsequent retreat, he again led an independent force. During the Battle of Ebelsberg on 3 May, he covered Hiller's south flank near Lambach and Steyr with 3,000 troops. Later he marched straight for Vienna and, together with Joseph, Baron von Mesko de Felsö-Kubiny commanded four battalions and five squadrons in the brief defense of Vienna. On 12 May, the bulk of Vienna's defenders withdrew to the north bank of the Danube where Nordmann's force was left to observe the French.

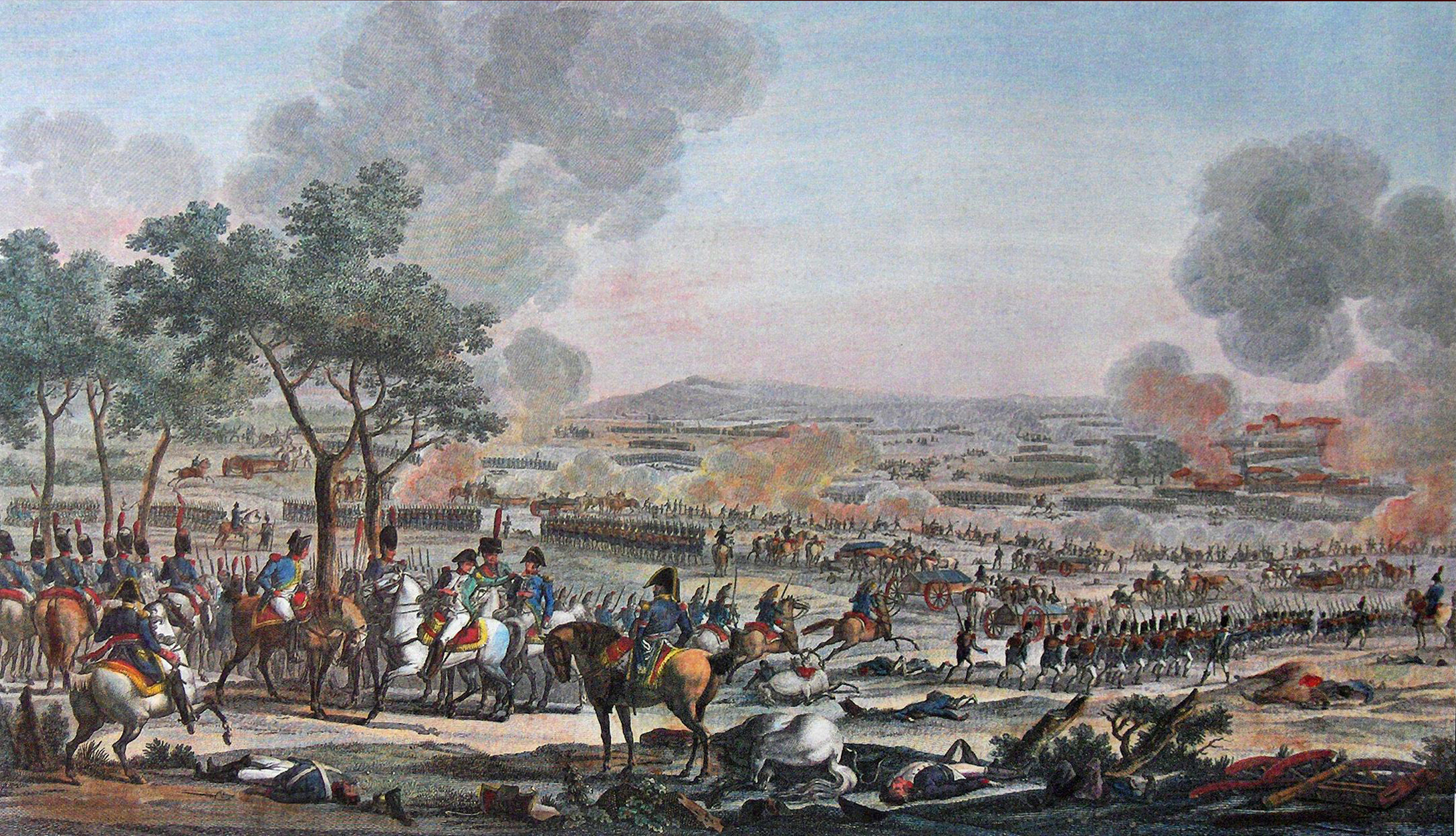
Nordmann was killed on 6 July 1809 at the Battle of Wagram.

At the Battle of Aspern-Essling on 21 and 22 May, Nordmann led an infantry brigade in Friedrich Kottulinsky's VI Armeekorps division that included one battalion of the Saint George Grenz, the 1st and 2nd Vienna Volunteer battalions, the remnant of the Broder Grenz Regiment # 7, and a 3-pounder brigade battery. According to another account, Nordmann led an advance guard of four battalions and eight squadrons to open the attack on Aspern. In an unsupported attack about 2:30 PM on the 21st, he tried to force his way into the village from the southwest and failed to dislodge the single French battalion then occupying the place. Later, Hiller shifted Nordmann's four battalions south to the Gemeinde-Au island, where his attacks were unsuccessful.

Nordmann received promotion to Feldmarschall-Leutnant on 24 May 1809. Archduke Charles appointed him to lead the army Advance Guard, with 11,837 infantry, 2,528 cavalry, and 26 guns. This mass of troops numbered more than the V or VI Armeekorps. Under his command were four brigades under Friedrich Riese, Joseph Mayer, Peter von Vécsey, and Franz Frelich. At the Battle of Wagram on 5 and 6 July, Charles assigned the Advance Guard and the VI Armeekorps to cover the river bank while the rest of the corps assembled farther inland. This doomed Nordmann's force to rough handling on the 5th when Napoleon's troops in greatly superior strength forced a crossing on the east side of Lobau Island and rolled up the Austrian defenses. Before retreating to the north, the Advance Guard suffered heavy losses, including most of its artillery. Nordmann took position on the Austrian left flank, in rear of Prince Franz Seraph of Orsini-Rosenberg's IV Armeekorps. That evening, the Advance Guard was subordinated to Rosenberg. On 6 July, Nordmann was slain in heavy fighting at the village of Markgrafneusiedl. He was one of four Austrian generals killed or mortally wounded at Wagram, the others being Josef Philipp Vukassovich, Konstantin Ghilian Karl d'Aspré, and Peter von Vécsey.
