= Stutterheim (surname) =

Stutterheim is a surname. Notable people with the surname include:

- Duncan Stutterheim (born 1971), Dutch entrepreneur
- Eddy Stutterheim (1908–1977), Dutch sailor

== See also ==
- Von Stutterheim, another surname
- Stutterheim, locality in South Africa
