= Joachim Friedrich von Stutterheim =

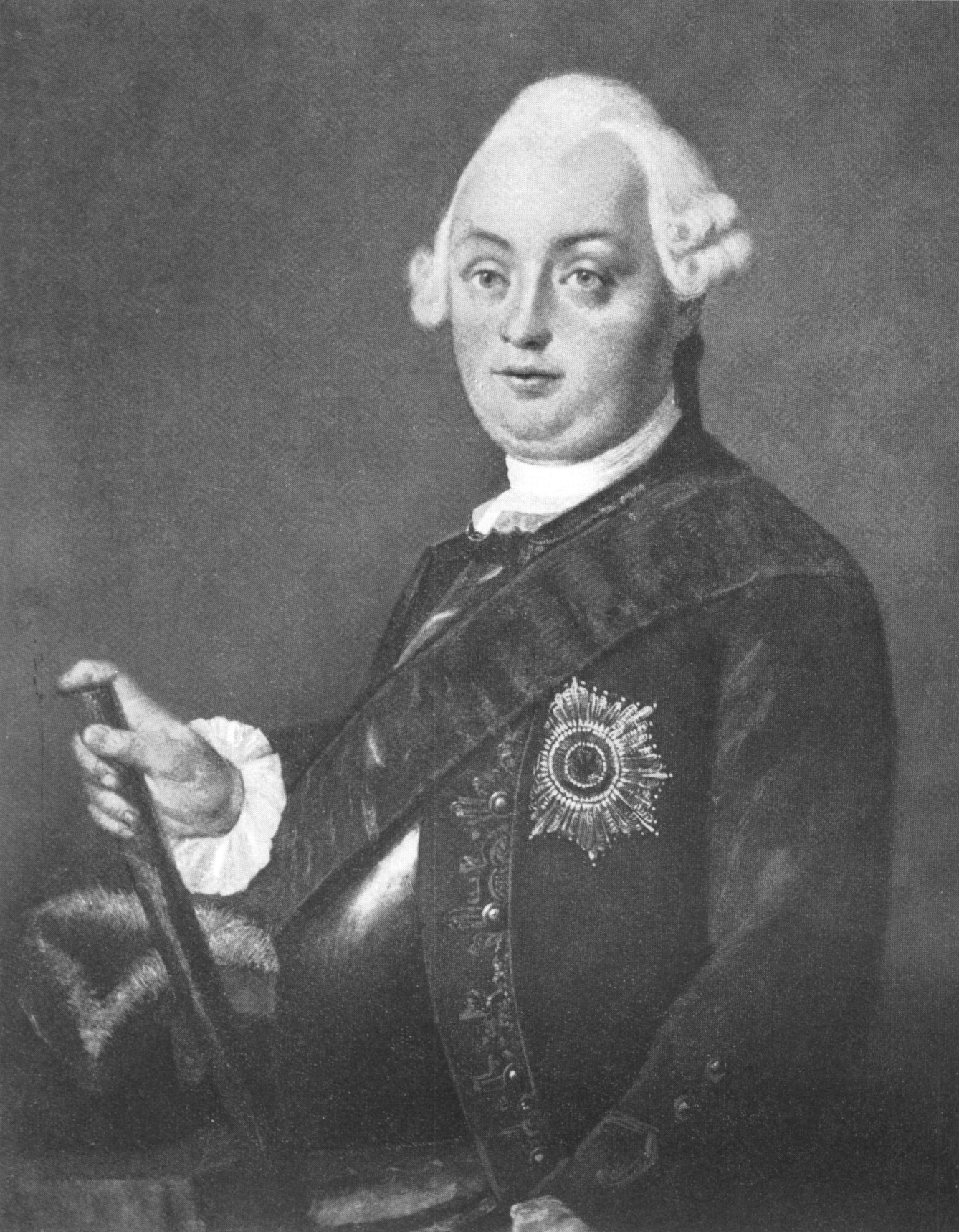
- The Old Stutterheim
- Born: 2 November 1715; Sellendorf, Lower Lusatia
- Died: 26 August 1783 (aged 67) Königsberg
- Allegiance: (Kingdom of Prussia) Prussia
- Service years: 1729–1783
- Rank: Generalleutnant
- Conflicts: War of the Austrian Succession; Seven Years' War
- Awards: Pour le Mérite; Order of the Black Eagle; Name inscribed on Frederick the Great's Equestrian Statue

Joachim Friedrich von Stutterheim („Alt-Stutterheim“), (2 November 1715 – 26 August 1783). He was known as the Old Stutterheim to distinguish him from his younger brother, Otto Ludwig (1718–1780), also a lieutenant general in Frederick the Great's army.

== Family ==
His parents were Joachim Friedrich von Stutterheim (1683–1745) and Johanne Eleonore von Hacke (1687–1737). His father was a captain in the Polish-Saxon army, and a landowner. His brother, Otto Ludwig (1718-1780), was also a Prussian lieutenant general. He was born 2 November 1715 in Sellendorf, Lower Lusatia. He married Sophie Therese von Lettow (1719–1807) and they had two sons, one of which, Ludwig August von Stutterheim, became a lieutenant general.

== Military career ==
After a chance encounter with King Frederick William I, whom Stutterheim liked, he was admitted to the Berlin Cadet corps in 1729. From 1732 he entered the "Regiment Kröcher zu Fuss" as a flag-bearer. In 1735, he was promoted to ensign and in 1739, to second lieutenant. As such, he went to the First Silesian War and at the Battle of Mollwitz, Stutterheim demonstrated his command abilities and a keen sense of the battlefield. Always ready to encourage initiative in his officers, Frederick awarded him the Order of Pour le Mérite, and gave him a position at the cathedral in Cammin, and a captaincy in a company in the Regiment La Motte zur Fuss. Stutterheim then fought in the battles of Chotusitz, Hohenfriedberg, and Soor, where, he was wounded.

In the year 1747, Stutterheim was promoted to the major and, at the Battle of Lobositz, he again demonstrated his leadership; the king gave him an extraordinary pension of 500 thalers a year. In May, 1757, Stutterheim commanded an infantry regiment as a lieutenant colonel. In this year, in which Stutterheim was also promoted to colonel, he fought at Prague, Kolín, and Breslau; he concluded the year at the Battle of Hochkirch. On 1 January 1759 Stutterheim was promoted to major general and received his own infantry regiment.

In 1760 he took part in the battles at Liegnitz and Torgau, where, at the latter, he led a battalion of grenadiers in the initial assault. He was severely wounded at Torgau. In 1761 he returned to the army of Prince Henry, who sent him with 1,600 men to protect the Mark against an invasion of the Swedes. He also made the last campaign, in 1762, under Prince Henry; In the Battle of Freiberg, on 29 October 29, he commanded the left wing of the attacking line. In recognition of his share of the victory, he received a canon at St. Nicolas in Magdeburg. When the peace was concluded, King appointed Stutterheim as inspector of the East Prussian infantry and sent him to Königsberg. In 1768, after becoming lieutenant general on 24 August 1767, he received the Black Eagle Order and another regiment, the former "Regiment Kaunitz zu Fuss". He was also appointed governor of Konigsberg, Pillau, and Memel.

In the War of Bavarian Succession, he was attached to the King's army at the point of a special corps from Upper Silesia. On 16 August 1778, his corps took possession of the city of Troppau.

== Accolades ==
Shortly before his death, Frederick wrote a short poem, Alt Stutterheim

Ihr könnt versichert seyn daß Euer Schicksal keinen bessern Händen als den meinigen anvertraut sein kann, Eure Dienste bleiben meinem Herzen unvergeßlich.
You can be assured that your fate can not be entrusted to better hands than mine, your services will remain unforgettable to my heart.

He died on 26 August 1783 in Königsberg; his name is memorialized on the Equestrian statue of Frederick the Great.

Military offices
Preceded by Karnacker	Proprietor of Infantry Regiment No. 30; 1757–1783	Succeeded by

Military offices
Preceded by Kaunitz	Proprietor of Infantry Regiment No. 2; 1767–1783	Succeeded by
