= Ludwig August von Stutterheim =

German soldier (1750–1826

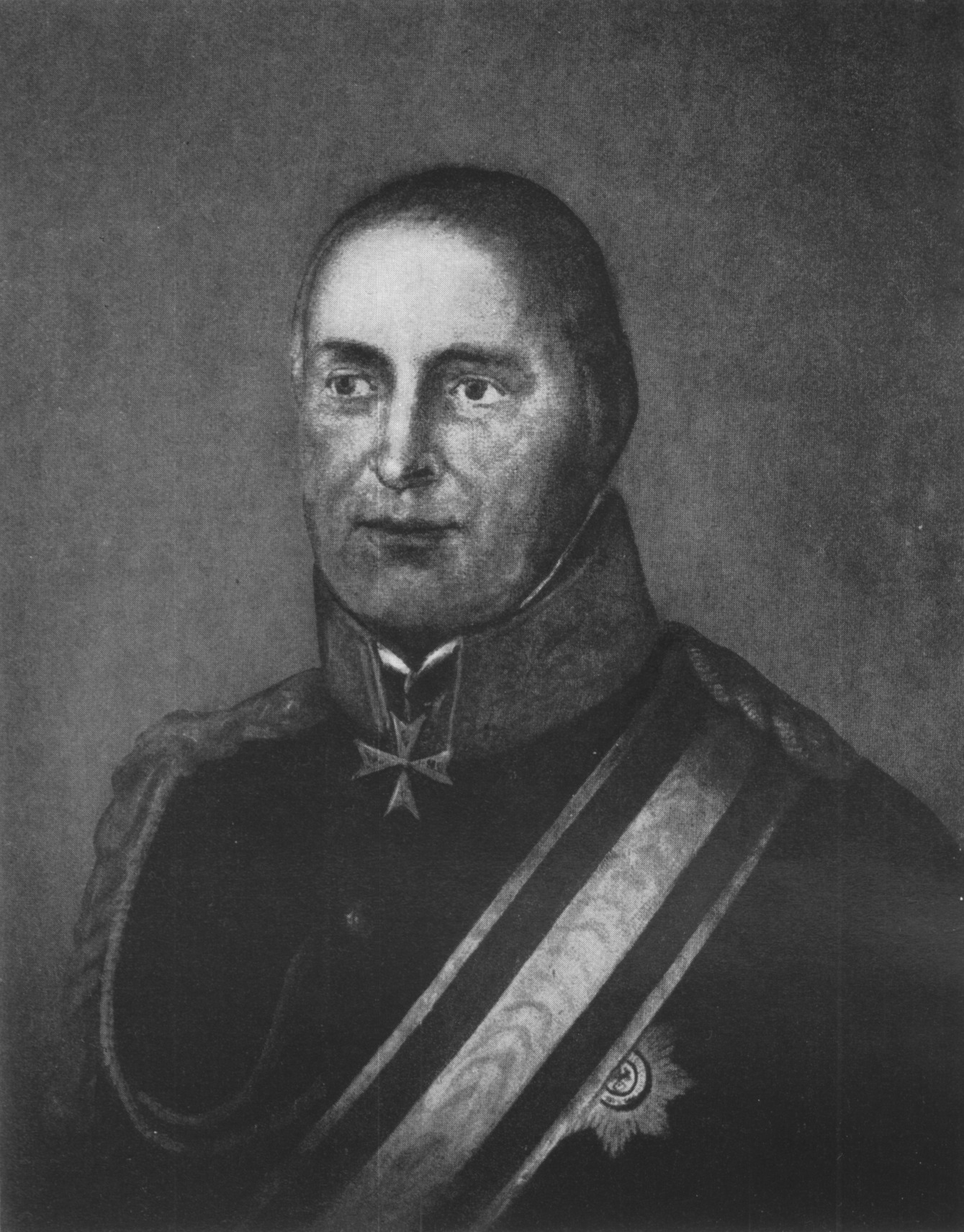
- Born: 1750 Pomerania
- Died: 13 October 1826 (aged 75–76) Königsberg
- Rank: General of the Infantry
- Battles / wars: War of Bavarian Succession; Kościuszko Uprising; Siege of Warsaw; War of the Fourth Coalition; Battle of Eylau; War of the Sixth Coalition
- Awards: Pour le Mérite (1794); Order of the Red Eagle (1809)

Ludwig August von Stutterheim served Frederick the Great and his successors in the War of Bavarian Succession, the Kościuszko Uprising, and the wars of the Fourth and Sixth coalitions. In 1794 he earned the prestigious Pour le Mérite award for his distinguished actions. He was promoted major general in 1807 after courageous behavior at the Battle of Eylau. He became a lieutenant general in 1811 and general of the infantry in 1824.

== Career ==
Stutterheim was the son of Lieutenant General Joachim Friedrich von Stutterheim and his wife Sophie Therese von Lettow. Born in 1750 in Pomerania, he entered the military service of Prussia on 4 February 1763, in his father's infantry regiment, called Alt-Stutterheim.

He was promoted to staff captain in 1778, to company chef later that year and participated in the War of Bavarian Succession in Bohemia and Silesia, a war during which most of the casualties occurred from hunger, disease and exposure. He was promoted on 6 June to staff captain and on 1 July 1778 to company captain. He was transferred to the Infantry Regiment No. 55 on 2 April 1789, where he was promoted to major on 4 July 1790. He fought in the war against the Kościuszko Uprising in Poland, especially at the meeting at Rawka on 6 June and the end of August 1794 was at the Siege of Warsaw, where he received the Order Pour le Mérite for his actions. In November 1795, he was transferred to the East Prussian Fusilier Brigade, and in September 1797 he was appointed brigadier.

=== Napoleonic wars ===
In the War of the Fourth Coalition (1806-7) against France, Stutterheim commanded the 21st Fusiliers, which was garrisoned in Heilsburg, East Prussia, part of modern-day Poland. At the Battle of Heilsberg, his regiments formed the advanced guard for the Russo Prussian army. For his insightful and brave conduct in the Battle of Eylau, he was promoted on 8 March 1807, to major general. Subsequently, he participated at the Battle of Königsberg (1807) on 14 June 1807 in support for the 3rd Outpost Brigade commanded by Prince von Anhalt Schaumburg. There he had his Fusiliers Nr. 21, two infantry battalions, four squadrons of dragoons, and 1 horse artillery battery. Most of the third outpost brigade under the direct command of the Prince had become separated from the main force on the night of 12/13 June and came up behind the French line. They tried to break through to rejoin Stutterheim's support unit, but were overwhelmed and capitulated. After the loss at Eylau and the subsequent Prussian military disintegration, he aligned himself with the army officers supporting a nationalist war.

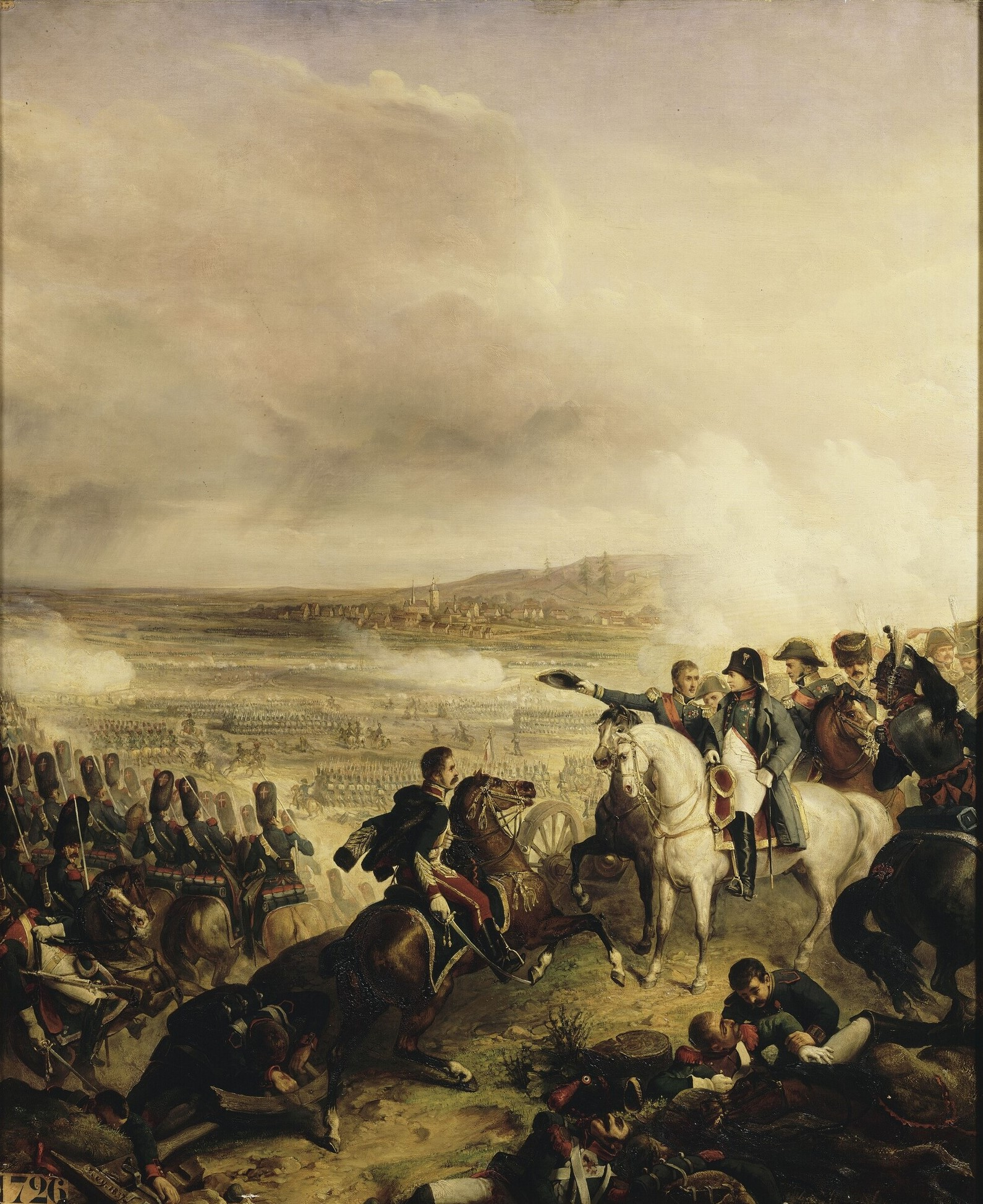
At the Battle of Heilsberg, Stutterheim's garrisoned troops were part of the advanced guard attack on the French army.

The King awarded Stutterheim the Order of the Red Eagle. On 11 December 1809, he became governor of Königsberg. He retired on 26 November 1811 as a lieutenant general with his pension. On 18 July 1813, though, he returned to the military service for War of the Sixth Coalition. During the Sixth Coalition, he served as quartermaster general of the 30,000 man-strong Austrian Hülfkorps, commanded by Karl Philipp, Prince of Schwarzenberg, although he does not appear to have moved west with Schwarzenberg's force, remaining behind to defend eastern Prussia to defend the countryside between the Vistula and the Oder.

=== Administrative work ===
After the war, Stutterheim belonged to a board of inquiry that examined the conduct of officers imprisoned by, or who collaborated with, the French. He also participated in the examination of Ludwig Yorck von Wartenburg, who had managed to salvage the Prussian army after the debacle in 1807. On 8 June 1814, he was governor of Königsberg for the second time, and held this post until his second retirement on 13 June 1825. In March 1824, he was promoted to General of the Infantry. He died on 13 October 1826 at Königsberg.
