= Inhaber =

Inhaber, or Proprietor, was a term used in the Habsburg military to denote special honors extended to a noble or aristocrat. The Habsburg army was organized on principles developed for the feudal armies in which regiments were raised by a wealthy noble, called the Inhaber (proprietor) who also acted as colonel of the regiment. Originally, he raised the regiment, funded its needs, and received a portion of its revenue, which might be plunder or loot. He also shared in its shame or its honors.

Within the Prussian Army, Bavarian Army and other German armies, the title was Regimentschef (English: Regimental Chief). The Imperial Russian military adopted a similar system. In the United Kingdom there is a similar title called Colonel of the Regiment. If the appointment was honorary, a "second" colonel was appointed who would fulfill the duties of the colonel. An honorary incumbent was similar to a British Colonel-in-chief.

== Practical application ==
When the Inhaber was a famous or royal person, a second colonel was chosen from among the nobility to perform his duties. For example, on 16 September 1789, Friedrich Joseph, Count of Nauendorf, led a successful raid on the island of Borecs in the Danube, which garnered massive amounts of supplies from the Turkish forces. On 9 November of that year, he led four squadrons of his regiment to capture Gladova, 10 miles (16 km) from the so-called Iron Gates of the Danube; he was afterward given command of Hussar Regiment H5 Wurmser, named for Dagobert Sigmund von Wurmser. After Wurmser's death, the regiment became known as Nauendorf.

== Authority and powers ==
In the Imperial-Royal Army, the Inhaber possessed wide powers. First, he could appoint company officers, or at least held the right of refusal. Second, he had considerable legal authority over his regiment, much like that of a feudal lord. A Colonel-Inhaber/Colonel Proprietor was originally a noble (or wealthy aristocrat) who raised the regiment. Subsequently, a noble or an officer who had achieved some distinction was appointed to the regimental position as an "honorary" appointment. Each regiment was identified by the Inhaber's name as well as a number, and when the Inhaber changed so did the regimental name.

There were exceptions to this practice: If the appointment was honorary, a "second" colonel was appointed who would fulfill the duties of the colonel. The 3rd Infantry Regiment (German) was known as the Erzherzog Karl, or Archduke Charles, from 1780 to 1847, named for Archduke Charles, one of the sons of Leopold II. He ceased to function as its direct commander upon his promotion to Field Marshal in 1796, but several "second" colonels were appointed to carry out the administrative and leadership functions of the regiment. The regiment bore Charles' name until his death in 1847. In another example, Karl Aloys von Fürstenberg was promoted to major general and, at the end of June 1790, given the coveted position of second colonel of the 34th Infantry-Regiment Anton Esterhazy, where he served as the executive officer for Antal Esterhazy, the Regiment's Colonel and Proprietor. Thus, a rising-star—in this case Fürstenberg—performed the day-to-day duties of the Colonel and Proprietor, who is usually a noble and is often posted in a different assignment, sometimes a different location. Another exception was the 4th Infantry Regiment, known as Deutschmeister (later Hoch- und Deutschmeister), whose title derived from the Grand Master (Hochmeister) of the Teutonic Order serving as its regimental proprietor. Rather than adopting the proprietor's personal name, the regiment retained only the title of "Hoch- und Deutschmeister".

The Inhaber usually held the position for life: For example, Karl Eugen, Prince von Lothringen-Lambesc was Colonel-Proprietor of the 21st Cuirassier Regiment, from 22 June 1794 until his death in Vienna on 21 November 1825. The Inhaber was often of the same nationality as the regiment, be it German, Bohemian, Moravian, Hungarian, or Galician, which reflected the Habsburg vision of their army as the feudal people-in-arms under the control of the aristocracy.

The Imperial Russian military also used this system, and regiments frequently bore the name of a geographic region from which it was originally raised.

== Sources ==
- (in German) Ebert, Jens-Florian. Die Österreichischen Generäle 1792–1815: Friedrich Freiherr von Hotze. Accessed 15 October 2009;
- (in German) Hürlimann, Katja. Johann Konrad (Friedrich von Hotze).
- Herold, Stephen. The Austrian Army in 1812. In: Le Societé Napoléonienne. Accessed 31 December 2009.
- Lins, Joseph. "Saint Petersburg." The Catholic Encyclopedia. Vol. 13. New York: Robert Appleton Company, 1912. 17 Oct. 2009.
- McCulloch, J. R. "Gladova." A dictionary, geographical, statistical, and historical of the various countries, places, and principal natural objects in the world. London: Longman, Brown, Green, and Longmans, 1854.
- Millar, Stephen. Austrian Infantry Regiments and Their Commanders 1792-1815: Line Infantry Regiments Nrs. 1-10. In Napoleon Series, Robert Burnham, Editor in chief. 1995–2009. Accessed 31 December 2009.
- (in German) Vaníček, Fr. Specialgeschichte der Militärgrenze: aus Originalquellen und Quellenwerken geschöpft. Wien: Aus der Kaiserlich-Königlichen Hof- und Staatsdruckerei, 1875.
