= Battle of Wagram order of battle =

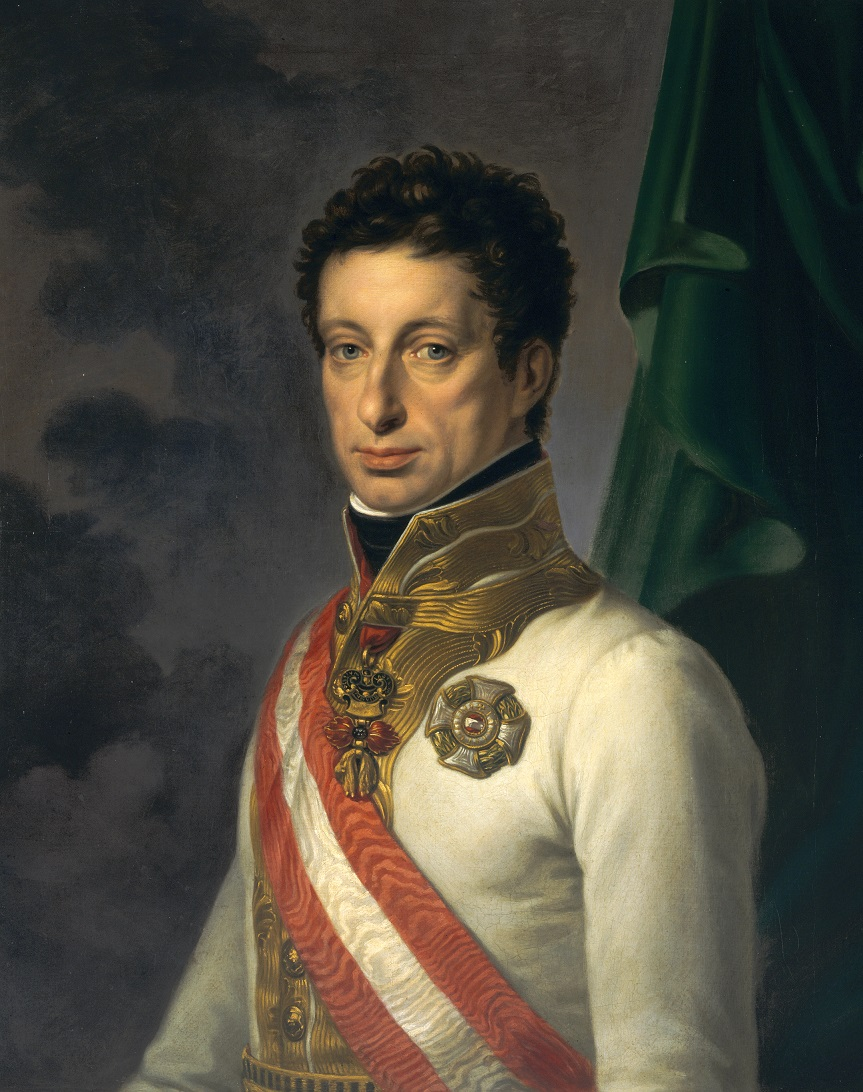
Archduke Charles, commander of the Austrian army

On the 5 and 6 July 1809, north of Vienna, took place one of the most important confrontations in human history until then, the Battle of Wagram. It opposed an Austrian army led by generalissimus Archduke Charles, Duke of Teschen to a Franco-Italo-German army under the command of Napoleon I, Emperor of the French, King of Italy, Protector of the Confederation of the Rhine.

Below are presented the military units which participated at this battle. On this page are listed only the troops who were close enough to the hostilities to be able to intervene. The Austrian V Corps, left behind as a strategic reserve, and the "Army of Inner Austria", whose elements from the vanguard arrived close to the battlefield only in the afternoon of the 6th, too late to intervene, have been omitted from the article. Similarly, the French VIII Corps left outside the theater of hostilities; the Franco-Allied garrison and the batteries on the island of Lobau; the squadrons and the French regiments left on the right bank of the Danube to protect the lines of communication, and most part of the Center Corps belonging to the Franco-Italian army, located in Pressburg, have also been omitted from this article because they played no part in the battle.

The Austrian army was not reinforced during the second day. Archduke Charles commanded about 140,000-150,000 men, including 15,000 cavalrymen and over 400 artillery pieces.

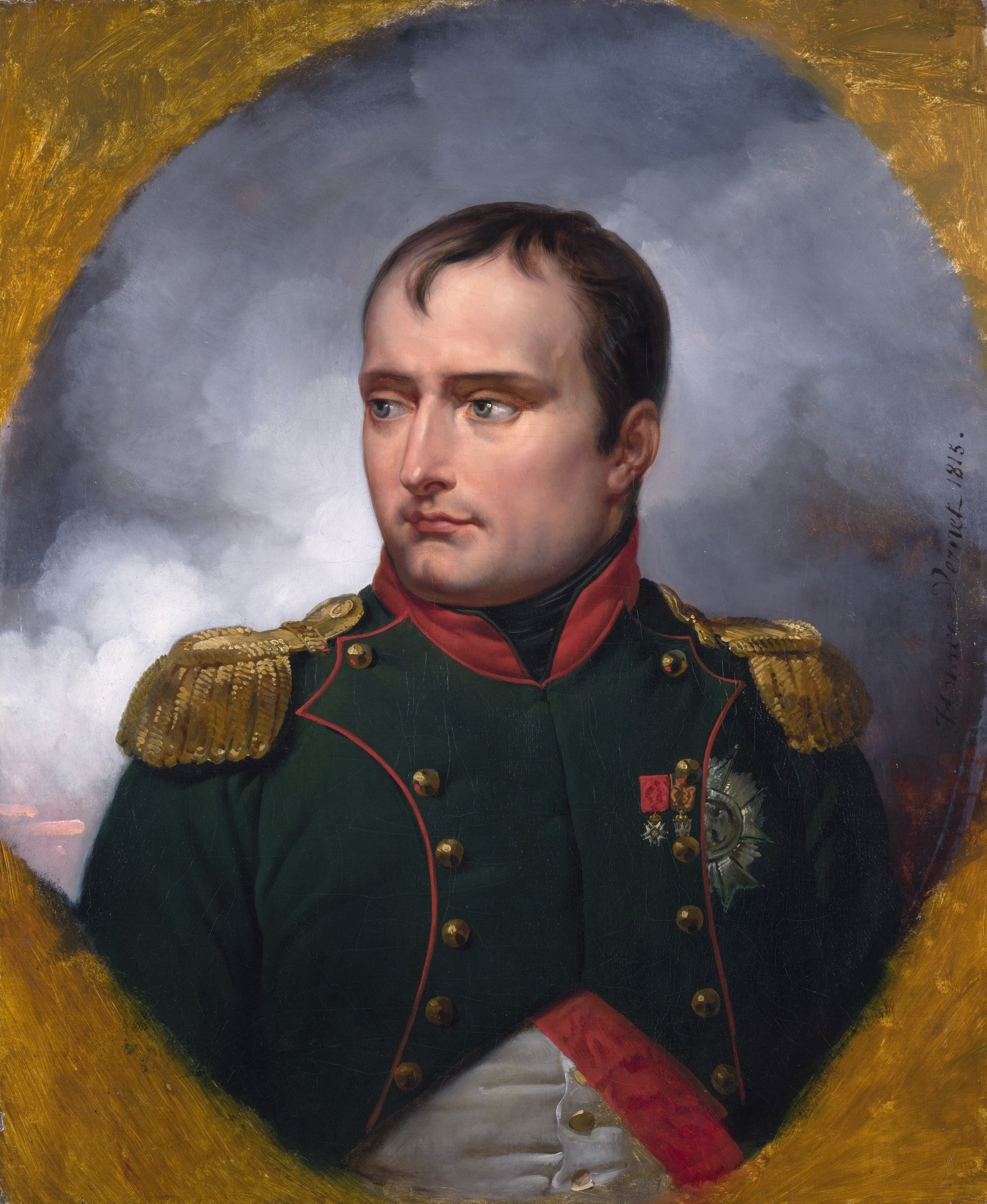
Napoleon I, commander of the Franco-Allied army

During the first day of the fighting, Napoleon's army numbered about 155,000-160,000 men and around the noon of the second day it was reinforced up to 165,000-180,000 men, out of whom 27,000 were cavalrymen, and more than 400 cannons. This figure remains approximate, as it does not take into consideration the losses suffered during the first day of the battle, which are difficult to estimate. The losses of the army are only a global estimation, including the hostilities on both the 5th and the 6th of July. In addition, on the 6th, Napoleon basically could not rely on the Saxon infantry from the Saxon IX Corps, which was completely disorganised and unfit for combat following the hard fighting during the first day. The French and Allied forces included two armies: the "Grand Army of Germany", which had taken part in the previous campaign in Southern Germany and Austria (the main theater of the War of the Fifth Coalition), and the "Army of Italy", of smaller dimensions, which arrived on the battlefield in stages and only with a part of its effectives, during the two days. The order of battle of the French Army was profoundly reorganised during June, and it was modified even during the battle, with some units being attached to different commanders, according to circumstances.

== Abbreviations of military ranks and dignities ==
French and Italian army	German army	Austrian army
MdE = Maréchal d'Empire (Marshal of the Empire)*	-	FM = Feldmarschall (Field Marshal)
-	-	FZM = Feldzeugmeister; GdK = General der Kavallerie (Cavalry General)
GD = Général de Division (Divisional General)	GL = General-Leutnant (Lieutenant General)	FML = Feldmarschallleutnant (Lieutenant Field Marshal)
GB = Général de Brigade (Brigadier General)	GM = General-Major (Major General)	GM = General-Major
Col = Colonel	Ob = Oberst	Ob = Oberst
CdB = Chef de Bataillon (Commandant)	Oblt = Oberstleutnant (Lieutenant Colonel)	Oblt = Oberstleutnant
Maj = Major	Maj = Major	Maj = Major
Cap = Capitaine (Captain)	Hauptmann	Hauptmann

Comments
* Maréchal d'Empire, or Marshal, was not a "rank" within the French army, but a personal title granted to distinguished generals of division, along with higher pay and privileges. The highest "rank" in Napoleon's army was actually Général de Division.

== Opposing armies ==
=== Kaiserlich-königliche Armee ===
The Austrian army, called Kaiserlich-königliche Armee (Imperial-Royal Army), was composed of multinational troops from across the Empire, including proper Austrians, Bohemians, Moravians, Hungarians, Romanians, Croatians, Poles and other ethnic groups, with regiments speaking various languages. Another facet that showed the diverse nature of this army was that Landwehr (Militias) units, some of which were quite poorly trained, were brigaded together with regular troops.

Following the Battle of Aspern-Essling, Charles massed whatever forces he could spare, recalling two-thirds of III Korps from Linz, but, with war raging on secondary theatres, he was unable or unwilling to recall any additional forces. Archduke Charles did plan for the small "Army of Inner Austria" under Archduke John of Austria to march out from Pressburg, some 40 kilometers away, and participate in the battle, reckoning that the timely arrival of this force would reinforce his weak left. Excluding the "Army of Inner Austria", the forces that Charles had available for the two days of battle were about 138,000 men, with 414 artillery pieces.

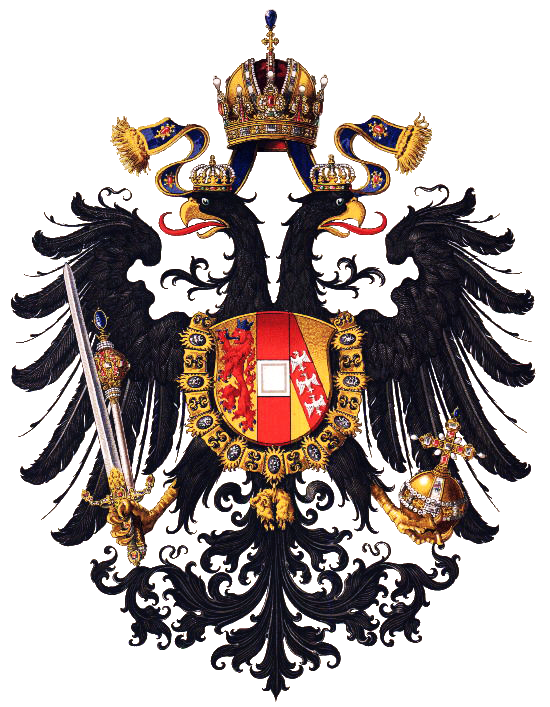

Archduke Charles, aged 37 at the time of the battle, had under his direct command the Kaiserlich-königliche Hauptarmee, the main Austrian army. He was seconded by 39-year-old Maximilian von Wimpffen, the army's Quartermaster General (Chief of Staff), a pugnacious and assertive character, who was well respected in the Austrian army for his knowledge of military strategy. The Austrian army was divided into several Korps, as follows:

- Advance Guard: 14,000 men, 48 guns, under the command of 49-year-old Feldmarschall-Leutnant Armand von Nordmann, a French émigré and a competent general;
- I Korps: 23,000 men, 68 guns, under the command of 53-year-old General der Kavallerie Heinrich von Bellegarde, who had served under Archduke Charles several times in the past and was a sound, albeit unenterprising commander;
- II Korps: 27,000 men, 68 guns, under the command of 52-year-old Feldmarschalleutnant Friedrich Franz Xaver of Hohenzollern-Hechingen, a Rhineland Prince and a commander with an impeccable reputation;
- III Korps: 18,000 men, 58 guns under 61-year-old Feldzeugmeister Johann Karl von Kollowrat-Krakowsky, a Bohemian noble with a long-standing military record;
- IV Korps: 19,000 men, 60 guns, under the command of 47-year-old Feldmarschalleutnant Franz Seraph of Rosenberg-Orsini, a descendant of a great German noble family of Italian descent, who had fought against the French during the French Revolutionary Wars and in 1805;
- VI Korps: 18,000 men, 64 guns, under the command of 51-year-old Feldmarschalleutnant Johann von Klenau, another Bohemian noble and a general who had won quite a remarkable reputation during the French Revolutionary Wars;
- I Reserve Korps: 18,000 men, 48 guns, under the command of 49-year-old General der Kavallerie Johann I Joseph, Prince of Liechtenstein, an Austrian Prince, competent commander and a personal friend of Archduke Charles.

Although in the vicinity of the battlefield, the V Korps (12,000 men, 50 guns) under Feldmarschalleutnant Prince Heinrich XV Reuss of Plauen had been left behind on the Bisamberg heights as a strategic reserve, a position which meant that it was too far away to take part to any fighting on or around the Marchfeld, and were thus not a part of Charles' effective fighting force. This was due to Charles's desire to protect his communication lines towards Bohemia and Moravia.

=== Grande Armée ===
As opposed to his Austrian counterpart, Napoleon managed to muster two secondary armies for the upcoming battle. The first, called the Army of Italy, had marched from northern Italy to the main theatre of operations north of Vienna and was led by Napoleon's stepson, the Viceroy of Italy, Prince Eugène de Beauharnais. The second was the XI Corps, which formed the Army of Dalmatia, under General of Division Auguste de Marmont. However, the Army of Dalmatia, as well as a part of the Army of Italy only arrived on the battlefield towards midday on 6 July, at about the same time as an additional force, a Bavarian division under general Karl Philipp von Wrede.

All these forces considered, Napoleon could muster an army of around 166,000 men, with 433 guns. He was seconded by Major Général (Chief of Staff), 56-year-old Maréchal d'Empire Louis-Alexandre Berthier, a seasoned officer, who had been serving as Napoleon's Chief of Staff since 1796. The army was organised in the usual French Corps system and the main army, Armée d'Allemagne ("Army of Germany") was divided as follows:

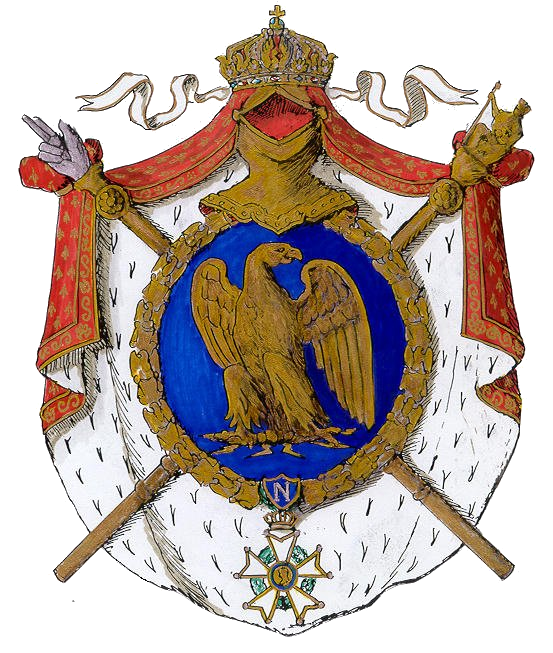

- The Imperial Guard: 10,500 men, 60 guns, under the direct command of Napoleon;
- II Corps: 27,000 men, 64 guns, under the command of 42-year-old Général de division Nicolas-Charles Oudinot, a fearless commander, who had a reputation for leading from the front;
- III Corps: 38,000 men, 120 guns, under the command of 39-year-old Maréchal d'Empire Louis-Nicolas Davout, a stern disciplinarian and one of the best commanders in the French army;
- IV Corps: 28,000 men, 86 guns, under the command of 51-year-old Maréchal d'Empire André Masséna, a general who had fought against the Austrians many times in the past and who had a reputation for exceptional military talent and cunning;
- VII Corps: only one Bavarian division (6,600 men, 24 guns) was present, under 42-year-old General von Wrede;
- IX Corps: 17,000 Saxons, 38 guns, under 46-year-old Maréchal d'Empire Jean-Baptiste Bernadotte, a commander who had acquired some fame during the Wars of the Revolution, but who often had strained relations with Napoleon;
- XI Corps ("Army of Dalmatia"): 10,000 men, 28 guns, under 34-year-old Général de division Auguste de Marmont, an up-and-coming commander and personal friend of the Emperor;
- The Reserve Cavalry Corps (three heavy cavalry divisions): 8,000 men, 24 guns, under the command of 40-year-old Maréchal d'Empire Jean-Baptiste Bessières, a skilled cavalry commander and loyal supporter of the Emperor.

The "Army of Italy", under the command of 27-year-old Prince Eugène, the Viceroy of Italy and Napoleon's stepson. Eugène's army had a total of 44 guns and was made up of:

- the small Italian Royal Guard (1,700 men) under 33-year-old Général de division Achille Fontanelli;
- V Corps: 7,000 men, under 43-year-old Général de division Jacques MacDonald, who had acquired considerable fame as a general of the Revolution but who had subsequently fallen out with Napoleon and was only just coming back into grace;
- VI Corps: 12,000 men, under 41-year-old Général de division Paul Grenier, a seasoned commander.

Napoleon also massed additional artillery on the island of Lobau – 28 18-pounders, 24 12-pounders, 17 28-centimetre heavy mortars, 10 howitzers and a number of small calibre guns (4 and 6-pounders). Also stationed on the island of Lobau during the battle were one regiment and 5 battalions defending the crucial communications with Vienna. These troops would not see action at Wagram, although the batteries would open an artillery barrage when Austrians from Klenau's VI Corps came within range, on the second day of the battle. All the forces that remained on this island were placed under the command of general Aubry, later under the command of general Jean-Louis Reynier.

Finally, the VIII Corps, under General of Division Dominique Vandamme was left out of the battle and was left behind to cover Vienna and the southern bank of the Danube upstream from the Austrian capital.

== Franco-Allied Forces ==
Commander: Emperor Napoleon I

=== Grand Army of Germany ===
Commander: Emperor Napoleon I

Aides-de-camp to the Emperor	Military Household of the Emperor
GD Lauriston	Grand Marshal GD Duroc
GB Savary	First Squire GD Nansouty
GB Lebrun	Maréchal des Logis du Palais GD de Ségur
GD Mouton	
GD Rapp (absent)	
GB Reille	
GD Le Marois (absent)	
GD Caffarelli (absent)	
GD Bertrand	

==== Army Staff ====
- Chief of Staff: MdE Berthier
  - Vice Chief of Staff: GD Dumas
    - Deputy to the Vice Chief of Staff: GB Bailly de Monthion
- Artillery commander: GD Lariboisière
  - Deputy artillery commander: GD Foucher
- Chief of military engineers: GD Bertrand
  - Deputy chief of military engineers: Col Blein

==== French Imperial Guard ====
Unit	Commander	Strength	Dead	Wounded
Imperial Guard	Napoleon I*	12,625		
1st Division (Young Guard)	GD Curial	4,668		
1st Brigade	GB Dumoustier	2,088		
Fusilier-Chasseurs Regiment (2 bat.)	Col Lanabère	1,029		
Fusilier-Grenadiers Regiment (2 bat.)	Col Bodelin	1,059		
2nd Brigade	GB Roguet	2,484		
Tirailleurs Chasseurs Regiment (2 bat.)	Col Rosey	1,294		
Tirailleurs Grenadiers Regiment (2 bat.)	Col Laurède	1,190		
2nd Division (Old Guard)	GD Dorsenne	2,656		
1st Brigade	GB Gros	2,656		
1st Foot Chasseurs Regiment (2 bat.)	GD Curial**	1,392		
1st Foot Grenadiers Regiment (2 bat.)	GB Michel	1,264		
3rd Division (Cavalry)	GD Walther	3,871		
Horse Grenadiers Regiment (4 sq.)	GB Thiry***	994		
Empress' Dragoons Regiment	GB Letort	995		
Chasseurs à Cheval Regiment (4 sq.)	GB Guyot	1,024		
Polish 1st Light Cavalry Regiment (4 sq.)	GB Krasiński	966		
Élite Gendarmes Legion (2 sq.)	GB Savary	309		
Artillery (10 batteries)	GD Lauriston	2,397/60 pieces	6 officers; 115 men	13 officers; 342 men
Foot artillery (4 batteries)	Col Drouot	24 12-pounders		
Foot artillery (one howitzer battery)	Maj Pommereul	4 24-pound howitzers		
Horse artillery (4 batteries)	Maj d'Aboville	24 6-pounders		
Horse artillery (2 batteries)	Maj Boulart	12 8-pounders		
Marines	Cap Baste	113		
Engineers	CdB Boissonet			

Comments
* Some authors (Naulet, Hourtoulle) cite GD Walther as being the commander of the entire Guard. General Walther had indeed commanded the Guard during the marches of this campaign. Rothenberg considers that Emperor Napoleon was the direct commander of the Guard, because he kept this unit under very strict control and it acted only at his command. Furthermore, Walther, although one of the most experienced generals on the battlefield, had previously commanded only cavalry. Thanks to his prestige among the ranks of this unit and the fact that he often commanded the Guard cavalry, MdE Bessières was naturally considered to have the authority to command this unit, although in this battle he was granted only the command of the Cavalry Reserve.

** GB Curial had been promoted to the rank of GD after the battle of Aspern-Essling and had been granted the command of the 1st Young Guard Division, but he nominally kept the command of the 1st Foot Chasseurs Regiment from the Old Guard as their deputy major general. The major general of the Foot Chasseurs (honorary appointment), MdE Soult, was in Spain.

*** Pigeard (La Garde Imperiale) cites GD Walther as being the direct commander of the Horse Grenadiers. It is certain that this general spent much of the 6th of July by directly commanding this unit, as it was his favourite one.

==== II Corps (Oudinot) ====
Unit	Commander	Strength	Losses
II Corps	GD Oudinot*	30,469 men	277 officers; 8,669 men
1st Division**	GD Tharreau	8,579	
1st Brigade	GB Conroux		
6th Light Regiment (1 bat., 4th)			
9th Light Regiment (1 bat., 4th)			
24th Light Regiment (1 bat., 4th)			
25th Light Regiment (1 bat., 4th)			
27th Light Regiment (1 bat., 4th)			
Corsican Tirailleurs (1 bat.)			
2nd Brigade	GB Albert		
8th Line Regiment (1 bat., 4th)	CdB Mariveaux		
24th Line Regiment (1 bat., 4th)			
45th Line Regiment (1 bat., 4th)			
94th Line Regiment (1 bat., 4th)			
95th Line Regiment (1 bat., 4th)			
96th Line Regiment (1 bat., 4th)			
3rd Brigade	GB Jarry		
4th Line Regiment (1 bat., 4th)			
18th Line Regiment (1 bat., 4th)	CdB Guigard		
54th Line Regiment (1 bat., 4th)			
63rd Line Regiment (1 bat., 4th)	CdB Mouchon		
2nd Division**	GD Frère***	8,834	
1st Brigade	GB Coehorn		
16th Light Regiment (1 bat., 4th)			
17th Light Regiment (1 bat., 4th)	CdB Boulon		
21st Light Regiment (1 bat., 4th)			
26th Light Regiment (1 bat., 4th)			
28th Light Regiment (1 bat., 4th)			
Tirailleurs du Po (1 bat.)			
2nd Brigade	GB Razout		
27th Line Regiment (1 bat., 4th)			
39th Line Regiment (1 bat., 4th)			
59th Line Regiment (1 bat., 4th)			
69th Line Regiment (1 bat., 4th)			
76th Line Regiment (1 bat., 4th)			
3rd Brigade	GB Ficatier		
40th Line Regiment (1 bat., 4th)			
64th Line Regiment (1 bat., 4th)			
88th Line Regiment (1 bat., 4th)			
100th Line Regiment (1 bat., 4th)			
103rd Line Regiment (1 bat., 4th)			
3rd Division	GD Grandjean****	7,861	
1st Brigade	GB Marion		
10th Light Regiment (3 bat.)	Col Berthezène		
2nd Brigade	GB Lorencez		
3rd Line Regiment (3 bat.)	Col Schobert		
57th Line Regiment (3 bat.)	Col Charrière		
3rd Brigade	GB Brun		
72nd Line Regiment (3 bat.)	Col Lafitte		
105th Line Regiment (3 bat.)	Col Blanmont		
Portuguese Legion	GB Lobo	1,651	
13th Demi-brigade (3 bat.)	GB Lobo		
Provisional Chasseur à Cheval Regiment (2 sq.)	Col Aguiar		
Light cavalry brigade	GB Colbert	1,650 men	
9th Hussar Regiment (3 sq.)	Col Gauthrin		
7th Chasseur à Cheval Regiment (3 sq.)	Col Bohn		
20th Chasseur à Cheval Regiment (3 sq.)	Col Castex		
Artillery (8 batteries) and engineers	GB Navelet	1,932 men/48 pieces (36 regimental pieces)	

Comments
* GD Oudinot replaced MdE Lannes, mortally wounded at the battle of Aspern-Essling, at the head of the II Corps.
** The 1st and 2nd divisions of this Corps were formed only from the 4th battalion of several regiments, some present at Wagram in the composition of other Corps, others being in Spain with their other 3 battalions and their colonel. The 4th battalion of these regiments was usually made up from young recruits without experience, divided, according to the new French system, in 4 "center" companies. To fill up the ranks, according to the regulations, 2 more "élite" companies were added (one of grenadiers and one of voltigeurs for the line regiments, and one of foot carabiniers and one of voltigeurs for the light regiments), generally consisting of veterans.
*** After the battle of Aspern-Essling GD Frère replaced GD Claparède at the head of the 2nd Division.
**** After the battle of Aspern-Essling GD Grandjean replaced GD Saint-Hilaire, mortally wounded on the 22nd of May, at the head of the 3rd Division.

==== III Corps (Davout) ====
Unit	Commander	Strength	Dead	Wounded
III Corps	MdE Davout	42,541	22 officers; 732 men	207 officers; 5,104 men
1st Division	GD Morand	8,643		
1st Brigade	GB Poncet			
13th Light Regiment (3 bat.)	Col Guyardet			
17th Line Regiment (3 bat.)	Col Oudet			
2nd Brigade	GB Hoff			
30th Line Regiment (3 bat.)	Col Joubert			
61st Line Regiment (3 bat.)	Col Bouge			
2nd Division	GD Friant	9,730		
1st Brigade	GB Gilly			
15th Light Regiment (3 bat.)	Col Noos			
33rd Line Regiment (3 bat.)	Col Pouchelon			
2nd Brigade	GB Barbanègre			
48th Line Regiment (3 bat.)	Col Groisne			
3rd Brigade	GB Grandeau			
108th Line Regiment (3 bat.)	Col Rottembourg			
111th Line Regiment (3 bat.)	Col Husson			
3rd Division	GD Gudin	10,508		
1st Brigade	GB Boyer			
7th Light Regiment (3 bat.)	Col Lamaire			
2nd Brigade	GB Leclerc des Essarts			
12th Line Regiment (3 bat.)	Col Thoulouse			
21st Line Regiment (3 bat.)	Col Decouz			
3rd Brigade	GB Duppelin			
25th Line Regiment (3 bat.)	Col Dunesme			
85th Line Regiment (3 bat.)	Col Piat			
4th Division	GD Puthod	4,734		
1st Brigade	GB Girard			
17th Line Regiment (1 bat., 4th)				
30th Line Regiment (1 bat., 4th)				
33rd Line Regiment (1 bat., 4th)				
61st Line Regiment (1 bat., 4th)				
65th Line Regiment (1 bat., 4th)				
2nd Brigade	GB Desailly			
7th Light Regiment (1 bat., 4th)				
12th Line Regiment (1 bat., 4th)				
25th Line Regiment (1 bat., 4th)				
85th Line Regiment (1 bat., 4th)				
111th Line Regiment (1 bat., 4th)				
Light cavalry division	GD Montbrun	1,219		
1st Brigade	GB Jacquinot			
1st Chasseur à Cheval Regiment (4 sq.)	Col Méda			
2nd Chasseur à Cheval Regiment (4 sq.)	Col Mathis			
7th Hussar Regiment (4 sq.)	Col Domon			
2nd Brigade	GB Pajol			
5th Hussar Regiment (4 sq.)	Col d'Héry			
11th Chasseur à Cheval Regiment (4 sq.)	Col Désirat			
12th Chasseur à Cheval Regiment (4 sq.)	Lt-Col Ghigny (?)			
1st Dragoon Division (detached from the Army of Italy)	GD Pully	1,182		
23rd Dragoon Regiment (4 sq.)	Col Thierry			
28th Dragoon Regiment (3 sq.)	Col Montmarie			
29th Dragoon Regiment (3 sq.)	Col Avice			
2nd Dragoon Division (detached from the Army of Italy)	GD Grouchy	2,300		
7th Dragoon Regiment (4 sq.)	Col Séron			
30th Dragoon Regiment (4 sq.)				
Italian attached Dragoni Regina Regiment (4 sq.)				
1st Cacciatori a Cavallo Regiment (1 sq.)				
Artillery (8 batteries) and engineers		1,393 men/51 pieces; 36 regimental pieces		

==== IV Corps (Masséna) ====
Unit	Commander	Strength	Dead	Wounded	Prisoners
IV Corps	MdE Masséna	29,391 men	1,084	6,018	1,213
1st Division	GD Legrand	5,083	400	1,545	49
1st Brigade	GB Ledru des Essarts				
26th Light Regiment (3 bat.)	Col Campi				
18th Line Regiment (3 bat.)	Col Ravier				
2nd Brigade (Baden)	Ob von Neuenstein		95	275	
Light Regiment (Jäger) (1 bat.)	Maj von Brandt				
1st Guard Regiment (Leibregiment) (2 bat.)					
2nd Infantry Regiment (Erbgrossherzog) (2 bat.)	Crown Prince Charles				
3rd Infantry Regiment (1 bat.)	Maj von Hochberg				
2nd Division	GD Carra Saint-Cyr	8,411	326	2,817	891
1st Brigade	GB Cosson				
24th Light Regiment (3 bat.)	Col Pourailly				
2nd Brigade	GB Dalesme				
4th Line Regiment (3 bat.)	Col Boyeldieu				
46th Line Regiment (3 bat.)	Col Baudinot				
3rd Brigade (Hesse-Darmstadt)	GB Schiner and GM von Nagel		127	453	
Guard Infantry Regiment (2 bat.)	Ob von Lehrbach				
Line Regiment (2 bat.)					
Guard Light Regiment (1 bat.)	Oblt von Beck				
3rd Division	GD Molitor	5,685	199	766	8
1st Brigade	GB Leguay				
2nd Line Regiment (3 bat.)	Col Delga				
16th Line Regiment (3 bat.)	Col Marin				
2nd Brigade	GB Viviès				
37th Line Regiment (3 bat.)	Col Gauthier †				
67th Line Regiment (3 bat.)	Col Petit				
4th Division	GD Boudet	4,584	39	280	95
1st Brigade	GB Fririon				
3rd Light Regiment (2 bat.)	Col Lamarque d'Arrouzat				
2nd Brigade	GB Valory				
93rd Line Regiment (2 bat.)	Col Grillot				
56th Line Regiment (3 bat.)	Col Gengoult				
Light cavalry brigade	GB Marulaz	1,464	82	250	80
3rd Chasseur à Cheval Regiment (3 sq.)	Col Saint-Mars				
14th Chasseur à Cheval Regiment (3 sq.)	Col Lion				
19th Chasseur à Cheval Regiment (3 sq.)	Col Leduc				
23rd Chasseur à Cheval Regiment (3 sq.)	Col Lambert				
Baden Dragoon Regiment (1 sq.)	Col Freystedt				
Hesse Chevau-léger Regiment (2 sq.)	Col Chamot and Maj von Munchingen				
4th light cavalry division (detached from the Cavalry Reserve)	GD Lasalle †	1,843	38	360	90
1st Brigade	GB Bruyères				
13th Chasseur à Cheval Regiment (3 sq.)	Col Demengeot				
24th Chasseur à Cheval Regiment (3 sq.)	Col Ameil				
2nd Brigade	GB Piré				
8th Hussar Regiment (4 sq.)	Col Laborde †				
16th Chasseur à Cheval Regiment (4 sq.)	Col Maupoint				
Artillery (10 batteries) and engineers		2,321 men/61 pieces			

==== VII Corps (von Wrede's Bavarian division) ====
Unit	Commander	Strength	Dead	Wounded
VII Corps	MdE Lefebvre (absent)			
1st Division (Bavaria)	GL von Wrede	6,866		
1st Brigade	GM von Minucci			
6th Light Infantry Bat.				
3rd Line Regiment (2 bat.)	Ob Berchem			
13th Line Regiment (2 bat.)				
2nd Brigade	GM von Beckers			
6th Line Regiment (2 bat.)				
7th Line Regiment (2 bat.)				
3rd Brigade	GM von Preysing			
2nd Chevau-léger Regiment (4 sq.)				
3rd Chevau-léger Regiment (4 sq.)				
Artillery (2 batteries) and engineers		460 men/16 pieces		

==== IX Corps (Bernadotte) ====
Unit	Commander	Strength	Dead	Wounded
IX Corps	MdE Bernadotte	18,272 men	61 officers; 887 men	133 officers; 4,131 men
1st Division (Saxony)	GL von Zerschwitz			
1st Brigade	GM Hartitzsch †			
Guard Grenadier Bat. (Leibgrenadiergarde)				
Bose's Grenadier Bat.				
Hach's Bat.				
2nd Brigade	GM von Zeschau			
King's Regiment (2 bat.)				
Niesemenschel's Bat.				
Klengel's Bat.				
3rd Brigade (cavalry)	GM Gutschmitz			
Leibgarde Regiment (2 sq.)				
Carabinier Regiment (2 sq.)				
Prince Clement Chevau-léger Regiment (2 sq.)				
Duke Albert Chevau-léger Regiment (1 sq.)				
Hussar Regiment (3 esc.)				
2nd Division (Saxony)	GL von Polenz			
1st Brigade	GM Lecoq			
Prince Clement's Bat.				
Low's Bat.				
Cerini's Bat.				
Egidy's Tirailleur Bat.				
2nd Brigade	Col Steindel			
Prince Maximilian's Bat.				
Prince Frederick's Bat.				
Prince Anton's Bat.				
3rd Brigade (cavalry)	GM Feititzsch			
Guard Cuirassier Regiment (4 sq.)				
Prince John Chevau-léger Regiment (4 sq.)				
3rd Division	GD Dupas		22 officers; 512 men	39 officers; 1,946 men
1st Brigade	GB Gency			
5th Light Regiment (2 bat.)	Col Dubreton			
2nd Brigade	GB Veaux			
19th Line Regiment (3 bat.)	Col Aubry			
Radelof's Bat.				
Winkelmann's Bat.				
Metzsch's Tirailleur Bat.				
Artillery (8 batteries) and engineers		938 men/41 pieces		

==== XI Corps or the Army of Dalmatia (Marmont) ====
Unit	Commander	Strength	Dead	Wounded
XI Corps (Army of Dalmatia)	GD Marmont	10,070 men		
1st Division	GD Claparède			
1st Brigade	GB Soyez			
5th Line Regiment (2 bat.)	Col Roussille			
3rd Brigade	GB Bertrand de Sivray			
79th Line Regiment (2 bat.)	Col Godart			
81st Line Regiment (2 bat.)	Col Bonté			
2nd Division	GD Clauzel			
1st Brigade	GB Delzons			
8th Light Regiment (2 bat.)	Col Bellair			
23rd Line Regiment (2 bat.)				
2nd Brigade	GB Bachelu			
11th Line Regiment (2 bat.)				
Light cavalry brigade		270 men		
3rd Chasseur à Cheval Regiment (1 sq.)				
24th Chasseur à Cheval Regiment (1 sq.)				
Artillery (2 batteries) and engineers	515 men and 19 pieces			

==== Cavalry Reserve (Bessières) ====
Unit	Commander	Strength	Dead	Wounded
Cavalry Reserve	MdE Bessières	8,696 men	16 officers; 171 troopers	66 officers; 693 troopers
1st Division (heavy cavalry)	GD Nansouty	4,039 men	12 officers; 105 troopers	37 officers; 415 troopers
1st Brigade	GB Defrance			
1st Carabinier Regiment (4 sq.)	Col Laroche			
2nd Carabinier Regiment (4 sq.)	Col Blancard			
2nd Brigade	GB Doumerc			
2nd Cuirassier Regiment (4 sq.)	Col Chouard			
9th Cuirassier Regiment (4 sq.)	Col Paultre de Lamotte			
3rd Brigade	GB Saint-Germain			
3rd Cuirassier Regiment (4 sq.)	Col Richter			
12th Cuirassier Regiment (4 sq.)	Col Dornes			
2nd Division (heavy cavalry)	GD Saint-Sulpice	1,994 men	2 officers; 27 troopers	5 officers; 66 troopers
1st Brigade	GB Fiteau			
1st Cuirassier Regiment (4 sq.)	Col Berckheim			
5th Cuirassier Regiment (4 sq.)	Col Quinette			
2nd Brigade	GB Guiton			
10th Cuirassier Regiment (3 sq.)	Col Lhéritier			
11th Cuirassier Regiment (3 sq.)	Col Duclaux			
3rd Division (heavy cavalry)	GD Arrighi	1,931 men	2 officers; 39 troopers	24 officers; 212 troopers
1st Brigade	GB Reynaud			
4th Cuirassier Regiment (4 sq.)	Col prince Borghese			
6th Cuirassier Regiment (4 sq.)	Col d'Haugéranville			
2nd Brigade	GB Bordesoulle			
7th Cuirassier Regiment (4 sq.)	Col Dubois			
8th Cuirassier Regiment (4 sq.)	Col Grandjean			
Artillery (one battery) and engineers		732 men/10 pieces		

=== Army of Italy (Eugène) ===
Under the overall command of Emperor Napoleon I, king of Italy

Commander: Prince Eugène

- First Adjutant: GB Charles Nicolas d'Anthouard de Vraincourt

Unit	Commander	Strength	Dead	Wounded
Army of Italy	Prince Eugène	16,659 men		
V Corps	GD MacDonald			
1st Division	GD Lamarque			
1st Brigade	GB Huard			
18th Light Regiment (2 bat.)	Col Christiani			
13th Line Regiment (3 bat.)	Col Huin			
2nd Brigade	GB Alméras			
23rd Line Regiment (2 bat.)	Col Minal			
29th Line Regiment (4 bat.)	Col Billard			
2nd Division	GD Broussier			
1st Brigade	GB Quétard			
9th Line Regiment (3 bat.)	Col Gallet			
84th Line Regiment (3 bat.)	Col Gambin			
2nd Brigade	GB Dessaix			
92nd Line Regiment (4 bat.)	Col Nagle			
VI Corps	GD Grenier			
1st Division	GD Seras			
1st Brigade	GB Moreau			
35th Line Regiment (1 bat.)	CdB Figié			
53rd Line Regiment (4 bat.)	Col Grosbon			
2nd Brigade	GB Roussel			
42nd Line Regiment (1 bat.)	CdB Juge			
106th Line Regiment (3 bat.)	Col Bertrand			
2nd Division	GD Durutte			
1st Brigade	GB Valentin			
23rd Light Regiment (3 bat.)	Col Horiot †; from the 6th of July Col Delacambre			
62nd Line Regiment (4 bat.)	Col Bruny			
2nd Brigade	GB Pastol (?) / GB Bruce (?)			
60th Line Regiment (2 bat.)	Maj Grobon			
102nd Line Regiment (3 bat.)	Col Sibra			
3rd Division	GD Pacthod			
1st Brigade	GB Abbé			
8th Light Regiment (2 bat.)	Col Bellair			
1st Line Regiment (4 bat.)	Col Saint-Martin			
2nd Brigade	GB Teste			
52nd Line Regiment (4 bat.)	Col Grenier J.G.			
Light cavalry division	GD Sahuc, wounded on the 5th of July, replaced by GB Gérard			
6th Chasseur à Cheval Regiment (4 sq.)	Col Ledard			
8th Chasseur à Cheval Regiment (4 sq.)	Col Curto			
9th Chasseur à Cheval Regiment (3 sq.)	Col Delacroix			
Guardia Reale	GD Fontanelli			
1st Brigade	GB Guérin			
Guardia del Onore (1 sq.)				
Dragoni della Regina (2 sq.)				
2nd Brigade	GB Lechi			
Granatieri (1 bat.)				
Cacciatori (1 bat.)				
Veliti (1 bat.)				
Artillery (6 batteries)	GD Sorbier	1,055 men/36 pieces		

== Austrian army ==
Commander: Archduke Charles, Duke of Teschen

- Chief of Staff: GM Maximilian von Wimpffen

=== Vanguard (von Nordmann) ===
Unit	Commander	Strength	Dead	Wounded
Vanguard (Light "Division")	FML von Nordmann †	14,365 men		
1st Vanguard Brigade	GM Vécsey †			
12th Hussar Regiment Palatin (6 sq.)	Ob von Illesy	756		
1st Jäger Bat.	Oblt Lutz	526		
58th Beaulieu Regiment (2 bat.)	Ob von Frohauf	1,022		
3rd Meinharts-Berg Landwehr Bat.		367		
2nd Vanguard Brigade	GM von Frölich			
7th Jäger Bat.	Maj von Steinmetz	510		
10th Hussar Regiment Stipsicz (8 sq.)	Ob Starhemberg	968		
13th Grenzer Regiment Wallachia-Illyria (2 bat.)		1,076		
1st Infantry Brigade	GM von Riese			
44th Bellegarde Regiment (3 bat.)	Ob von Studnitz	1,640		
46th Chasteler Regiment (3 bat.)	Ob von Kirchberg	1,601		
1st Vienna Woods Landwehr Bat.		342		
2nd Vienna Woods Landwehr Bat.		352		
2nd Infantry Brigade	GM von Mayer			
4th Deutschmeister Regiment (3 bat.)	Ob von Klopstein	1,064		
49th Kerpen Regiment (3 bat.)	Ob von Langenau	1,623		
5th Vienna Woods Landwehr Bat.		340		
6th Vienna Woods Landwehr Bat.		325		
Cavalry Brigade	GM von Schneller			
4th Hussar Regiment Hessen-Homburg (8 sq.)	Ob Prince Gustav zu Hessen-Homburg	804		
Artillery (4-6 batteries) and engineers		26 (?) pieces		

=== I Corps (von Bellegarde) ===
Unit	Commander	Strength	Dead	Wounded
I Corps	GdK von Bellegarde	21,693 men		
1st Division	FML von Dedovich	11,850		
1st Brigade	GM von Henneberg			
17th Reuss-Plauen Regiment (3 bat.)	Ob von Oberdorf	3,124		
36th Kollowrat Regiment (3 bat.)	Ob Klenau	3,147		
2nd Brigade	GM de Wacquant			
11th Archduke Rainer Regiment (3 bat.)	Ob von Fabre	2,916		
47th Vogelsang Regiment (3 bat.)	Ob Bentheim-Steinfurt	2,763		
2nd Division	FML Fresnel	9,843		
1st Brigade	GM von Clary			
10th Mitrowsky Regiment (2 bat.)	Ob von Lowenwarth	1,914		
42nd Erbach Regiment (2 bat.)	Ob von Brixen	2,157		
Hradischer Landwehr Bat.		396		
2nd Brigade	GM von Motzen			
35th Argenteau Regiment (3 bat.)	Ob von Giessenburg	2,980		
4th Archduke Charles' Legion Bat.		952		
Vanguard Brigade	GM von Stutterheim			
2nd Jäger Bat.	Maj von Arno	743		
5th Chevau-léger Regiment Klenau (8 sq.)	Ob von Spiegel	801		
Artillery (9-10 batteries) and engineers		62-70 pieces		

=== II Corps (von Hohenzollern) ===
Unit	Commander	Strength	Dead	Wounded
II Corps	GdK von Hohenzollern	25,951 men		
1st Division	FML von Brady	13,403		
1st Brigade	GM von Paar			
54th Froon Regiment (3 bat.)	Ob von Andrassy			
25th Zedwitz Regiment (3 bat.)	Ob von Quallenburg			
3rd Hradischer Landwehr Bat.				
2nd Znaimer Landwehr Bat.				
2nd Brigade	GM Buress			
57th Joseph Colloredo Regiment (3 bat.)	Ob Ellger			
15th Zach Regiment (2 bat.)	Ob von Carpenstein			
1st Brünner Landwehr Bat.				
3rd Brünner Landwehr Bat.				
2nd Division	FML von Ulm*	12,547		
1st Brigade	GM von Allstern			
21st Rohan Regiment (3 bat.)	Ob von Krause			
2nd Brigade	GM von Wied-Runkel			
18th d'Aspre Regiment (3 bat.)	Ob von Riesenburg			
28th Fröhlich Regiment (3 bat.)	Ob von Mecsery			
Vanguard Brigade	GM von Hardegg	2,126		
2nd Archduke Charles' Legion Bat.				
8th Jäger Bat.	Oblt Mumb			
4th Chevau-léger Regiment Vincent (6 sq.)	Ob Fierland			
Artillery (10 batteries) and engineers		68 pieces		

Comments
* Some sources state FML Ulm's division was commanded by FML von Siegenthal.

=== III Corps (Kollowrat) ===
Unit	Commander	Strength	Dead	Wounded
III Corps	FZM Kollowrat	16,596		
1st Division	FML Saint-Julien	8,363		
1st Brigade	GM von Lilienberg			
23rd Würzburg Regiment (2 bat.)	Ob von Sterndahl			
1st Kaiser Regiment (2 bat.)	Ob Prince Hohenlohe-Langenburg			
12th Manfredini Regiment (3 bat.)	Ob von Winzian			
2nd Brigade	GM von Bieber			
20th Kaunitz Regiment (3 bat.)	Ob von Sternau			
38th Württemberg Regiment (2 bat.)	Ob de Lompret			
2nd Division	FML von Vukassovich †	8,233		
1st Brigade	GM von Grill			
56th Wenzel Colloredo Regiment (3 bat.)	Ob von Giffing			
7th Karl Schröder Regiment (3 bat.)	Ob von Heldensfeld			
2nd Brigade	GM Wratislaw			
Prager Landwehr Bat.				
1st Berauner Landwehr Bat.				
Vanguard Brigade	GM von Schneller*			
2nd Berauner Landwehr Bat.				
Lobkowitz Jäger Bat.				
2nd Uhlan Regiment Schwarzenberg (6 sq.)	Ob Schmuttermayer			
Artillery (8-10 batteries) and engineers		54-70 pieces		

Comments
* Some sources state GM Schneller's brigade was commanded by Ob Schmuttermayer.

=== IV Corps (von Rosenberg) ===
Unit	Commander	Strength	Dead	Wounded
IV Corps	FML von Rosenberg	18,024		
1st Division	FML Prince zu Hohenlohe-Bartenstein	4,479		
1st Brigade	GM Prince Philipp zu Hessen-Homburg			
2nd Hiller Regiment (3 bat.)	Ob von Torri			
33rd Sztarry Regiment (3 bat.)	Ob von König			
2nd Division	FML de Rohan	5,368		
1st Brigade	GM von Swinburne			
8th Archduke Louis Regiment (3 bat.)	Ob von Fürstenwarther			
22nd Koburg Regiment (3 bat.)	Ob von Watzel			
1st Iglauer Landwehr Bat.				
1st Znaimer Landwehr Bat.				
3rd Division	FML Radetzky	8,177		
1st Brigade	GM Weiss von Finkenau			
50th Stain Regiment (3 bat.)				
3rd Archduke Charles Regiment (3 bat.)				
4th Vienna Woods Landwehr Bat.				
2nd Schönborn Landwehr Bat.				
Vanguard Brigade	GM de Provèncheres			
Waltrich Jäger Bat.				
2nd Mahrish Volunteer Bat.				
3rd Hussar Regiment Archduke Ferdinand (8 sq.)	Ob Prince zu Sachsen-Coburg			
Carneville Free Corps (1 sq. + 1/3 bat.)				
Artillery (9 batteries) and engineers		60 pieces		

=== VI Corps (Klenau) ===
Strength: 13 742

1 st Division FML Vincent - Strength 3 750

1. Brigade GM Wallmoden Grenzer Regiment B (1/2 Bat.) Husaren-Regiment 7 Liechtenstein (8 Esc.) 2. Brigade GM Mariassy Bat. 1 Volunt. Vienna Bat. 2 Volunt. Vienna Bat. Landwehr Colloredo 3. Brigade GM Vecsey † Bat. Grenzer Saint-Georg Husaren - Regiment 8 Kienmayer

2 nd Division FML Hohenfeld - Strength 6 331

1. Brigade GM Adler Regiment 14 Ob Klebek (2 Bat.) Regiment 59 Ob Jordis (2 Bat.) Bat. 3 Landwehr din Mähren Bat. 1 Landwehr Bat. 3 Leg. Erzherzog Karl Carl 2. Brigade GM Hofmeister Regiment 60 Ob Giulay (3 Bat.) Regiment 36 Ob Kollowrat (3 Bat.)

3 rd Division FML Kottulinsky - Strength 3 661

1. Brigade GM Spleny Regiment 51 Ob Spleny (3 Bat.) Regiment 31 Ob Benjowsky (2 Bat.) Bat. 3 Volunteer Vienna Bat. 4 Volunteer Vienna Bat. 1 Volunteer Mähren

=== Reservekorps (Liechtenstein) ===
Strength: 17 954

1st Grenadier-Division FML d'Aspré † - Strength 3 960

1. Brigade GM Merville Bat. Grenad. Ob Scharlach Bat. de Grenad. Scovaud Bat. de Grenad. Ob Buteany Bat. de Grenad Ob Brzezinsky 2. Brigade GM Hammer Bat. Grenad Ob Kirchenbetter Bat. Grenad. Ob Bissingen Bat. Grenad. Ob Oklopsia Bat. Grenad. Ob Locher

2nd Grenadier-Division FML Prochaska - Strength 5 940

1. Brigade GM Murray Bat. Grenad Ob Frisch Bat. Grenad Ob Georgy Bat. Grenad Ob Portner Bat. Grenad Ob Leiningen 2.Brigade GM Steyrer Bat. Grenad Ob Hahn Bat. Grenad Ob Hromada Bat. Grenad Ob Legrand Bat. Grenad Ob Dumontant Bat. Grenad Ob Berger

1 st Cavalry- Division FML Hessen-Homburg - Strength 3 134

1st Brigade GM Roussel Kürass.-Regiment 3 Albert (6 Esc.) Kürass.Regiment 2 Erzherzog Franz(6 Esc.) 2 nd Brigade GM Lederer Kürass. Regiment 4 Erzherzog Ferdinand (6 Esc.) Kürass.Regiment 8 Hohenzollern (6 esc.) 3. Brigade GM Kroyher Kürassier Regiment 1 (4 Esc.) Kürass.Regimentul 6 Liechtenstein (6 Esc.)

2 nd Cavalry –Division FML Schwarzenberg - Strength 1 800

1 st Brigade GM Teimern Regiment 6 Chevaulegers Rosenberg (8 Esc.) Dragoner-Regiment 3 Ob.Knesevitch (6 Esc.) 2. Brigade GM Kerekes Husaren-Regimen ob Neutrauer (6 Esc.)

3 rd Cavalry Division FML Nostitz - Strength 3 120 1 st Brigade 1 GM Wartensleben Regiment 3 Chevaulegers Ob. O'Reilly (6 Esc.) Husaren Regiment 6 Ob. Blankenstein (10 Esc.) 2.nd Brigade GM Rothkirch Dragoner-Regiment 1 Erzherzog Johann (6 Esc.) Regiment 6 Dragon. Ob Riesch (6 Esc.)
