= Francisco de Melo Franco =

Francisco de Melo Franco ComC
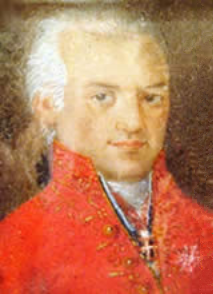
- Born: 17 September 1757; Paracatu, Minas Gerais, Colonial Brazil
- Died: 22 July 1822 (aged 64); Off the coast of Ubatuba, São Paulo, United Kingdom of Portugal, Brazil and the Algarves
- Education: University of Coimbra
- Occupation: Physician

Francisco de Melo Franco (Note: Also rendered as Francisco de Mello Franco, as it was usually spelt before the spelling reforms of the 20th century.) (17 September 1757 – 22 July 1822) was a Colonial Brazilian medical doctor, a pioneer in the field of puericulture and one of the most important court physicians in Portugal in his day. He was the author of several works in the fields of medicine and political philosophy.

== Biography ==
Francisco de Melo Franco was born in the town of Paracatu, then in the Captaincy of Minas Gerais, Colonial Brazil. He was the son of João de Melo Franco, a wealthy mining and cattle merchant, and his wife Ana de Oliveira Caldeira. He travelled to Portugal to study in the University of Coimbra, where he earned a degree in medicine.

As a student, he adopted the burgeoning liberal ideas that started to gain a marked influence among Portuguese political thinkers; he was arrested and convicted by the Inquisition as a heretic, seditionist and naturalist in a 1781 auto-da-fé.

Graduating in 1786, he settled in Lisbon where he earned a reputation as an excellent clinician. By charter of Queen Maria I, dated 9 June 1793, he was made Honorary Physician of the Royal Household and, on 3 August 1796, he was made a cavaleiro-fidalgo. He became a Corresponding Fellow of the Lisbon Royal Academy of Sciences, with which he actively contributed in the fields of medical and natural science.

In 1792, at the request of the Council of State, Francisco de Melo Franco was one of the signatories of the certificate that confirmed Queen Maria I's mental inability to continue to conduct government affairs, starting the long regency of her son, John, Prince of Brazil.

Among Francisco de Melo Franco's most important works are a book on puericulture, titled Tratado da Educação Física dos Meninos, para Uso da Nação Portuguesa ("A Treatise on the Physical Education of Children for the Use of the Portuguese Nation", 1790), considered the first work exclusively dedicated to the topic of child rearing in the Lusophone world. Another important book was Elementos de Higiene ou Dictames Theoreticos, e Practicos para Conservar a Saude e Prolongar a Vida ("Elements of Hygiene, or, Theoretical and Practical Dictamens to Conserve Health and Extend Life"), first published in Lisbon in 1814. As a polemicist, he published the satirical O Reino da Estupidez ("The Kingdom of Stupidity", 1785), and Medicina Theologica, ou Súplica Humilde Feita a Todos os Senhores Confessores e Directores sobre o Modo de Proceder com os Seus Penitentes na Emenda dos Peccados, Principalmente da Lascívia, Cólera e Bebedice ("Theological Medicine, or, a Humble Plea Made to All Confessors and [Spiritual] Directors on How to Proceed with Their Penitents on the Emendation of Their Sins, Chiefly Lechery, Wrath, and Drunkenness", 1794), in which the author argues for the uselessness of the moral remedies advocated by theologians, aiming to replace confessors and the traditional religious anthropology with physicians and a naturalistic anthropology. In opposition to the mainstream Thomistic philosophy, Melo Franco attributed passions and disorders of the mind to somatic causes, through which he argued that Salvation of the soul was also dependent on the good health of the body.

In 1817, after the transfer of the Portuguese court to Brazil, Francisco de Melo Franco accompanied Princess Maria Leopoldina of Austria on her voyage to Rio de Janeiro, where he then settled. Melo Franco was the target of intrigue at court and was soon after banished from attending; the exact nature of the controversy is unclear, but some authors posit it was due to his known liberal sympathies, which perhaps made him the target of accusations of being complicit in Gomes Freire de Andrade's attempted coup in Lisbon or of being favourable to the cause of Brazilian independence (he was known to be close to José Bonifácio de Andrada).

He died off the coast of Ubatuba, during a sea voyage returning to Rio de Janeiro from Santos, where he had travelled to seek treatment for a "lesion on [his] trachea", and was buried in the nearby Ilha dos Porcos.

== Distinctions ==
=== National orders ===
- Commander of the Order of Christ (1819; refused it in 1813 in favour of his son Justiniano)
