= Battle of Castelfranco Veneto =

1805 battle during the War of the Third Coalition

- Part of the War of the Third Coalition
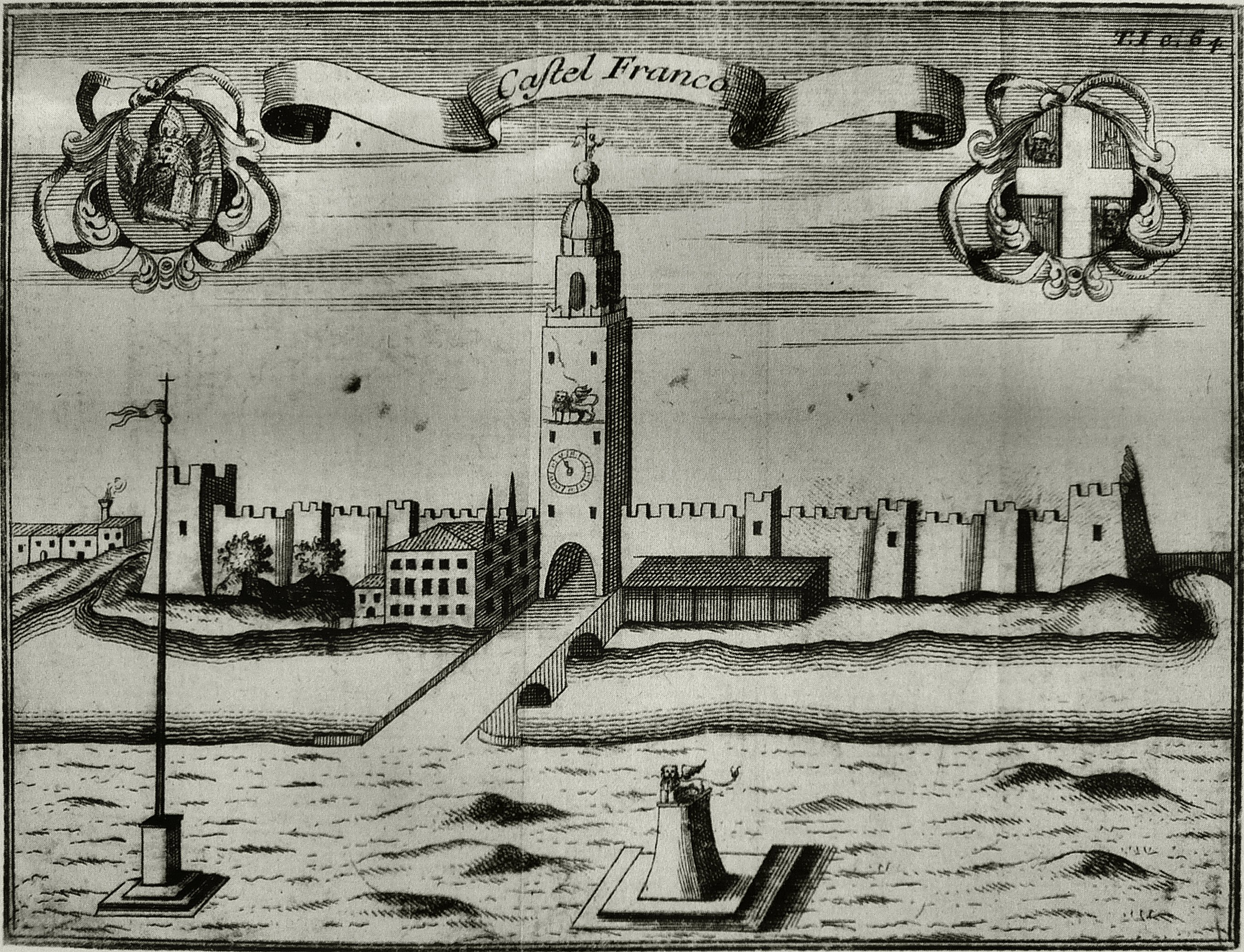
- Castelfranco as it appeared in 1697
| Date | 24 November 1805 |
| Location | Castelfranco Veneto, Italy |
| Result | French victory |

Belligerents
| (First French Empire) France; Kingdom of Italy | Austrian Empire |

Commanders and leaders
| (First French Empire) L. Gouvion Saint-Cyr (First French Empire) Jean Reynier | (Austrian Empire) Prince Rohan (POW) |

Units involved
| Army of Italy (France) | Rohan's Brigade |

Strength
| over 8,000 | 4,400, 5 guns |

Casualties and losses
| Light | 4,400, 5 guns, 4 colors |

In the Battle of Castelfranco Veneto (24 November 1805), two divisions of the French Army of Italy confronted an Austrian brigade led by Louis Victor Meriadec de Rohan-Guéméné. The Austrians had made a remarkable march from deep in the Alps to the plains of northern Italy. But, caught between the divisions of Jean Reynier and Laurent Gouvion Saint-Cyr, Rohan surrendered his command after failing to fight his way out. The event occurred during the War of the Third Coalition, part of the Napoleonic Wars. Castelfranco Veneto is located 40 kilometres (25 mi) northwest of Venice.

The Ulm Campaign of October 1805 resulted in an Austrian disaster when the Grande Armée of Napoleon enveloped and destroyed most of its units. Afterward, only Michael von Kienmayer's fleeing corps and a newly arriving Russian army under Mikhail Kutuzov stood between Napoleon and the Austrian capital of Vienna. After hearing the news of Ulm, the main army of Archduke Charles, Duke of Teschen began withdrawing from northern Italy and Archduke John of Austria's smaller army pulled out of the County of Tyrol. In the confusion, Rohan's brigade became separated from John's army. First, Rohan attempted to join part of Charles' army. Failing, he had his men move south to link up with the Austrian garrison of Venice. After an epic march Rohan's brigade was cornered short of Venice. The issue of the war would be determined at the Battle of Austerlitz in early December.

== March ==
One Austrian brigade led by General-major Prince Louis Victor de Rohan-Guéméné became separated from Archduke John's army. Hoping to join Feldmarschall-Leutnant Johann von Hiller's wing of Archduke Charles' army in Italy, Rohan looked to the south. Starting from Landeck in the County of Tyrol on 10 November, he marched his men south. Missing both Hiller and Charles, he determined to cut his way to Venice. Seizing Bolzano on 18 November, he then marched his brigade south to Trento. From there, he turned east into the Val Sugana before swinging south into the Brenta River valley. Where the Brenta leaves the mountains, the Austrians surprised and ejected the French garrison of Bassano on 22 November. Marching hard, the Austrians reached Castelfranco Veneto the next evening. On 24 November, Rohan's epic march came to an end when his troops were trapped between the divisions of Generals of Division Jean Reynier and Laurent Gouvion Saint-Cyr. After a struggle, the Austrian soldiers surrendered.

== Capitulation ==
Reynier's division numbered 8,000 men in 11 battalions with 12 guns. His command consisted of the 1st Swiss Infantry Regiment and the 10th, 53rd, 56th, and 62nd French Line Infantry Regiments. The strength and composition of Gouvion Saint-Cyr's division was not given.

Rohan's cavalry included eight squadrons of the Archduke Ferdinand Cuirassier Regiment Nr. 4, and one squadron of the Hohenzollern Chevau-léger Regiment Nr. 2 and a combined squadron. His infantry comprised four battalions of the Duka Infantry Regiment Nr. 39, the 2nd and 4th Battalions of the Beaulieu Infantry Regiment Nr. 58, and one combined battalion. Altogether, 4,400 soldiers, five artillery pieces, and four colors were surrendered to the French. Austrian killed and wounded were not reported though Rohan was wounded. It is known that the French suffered 16 officer casualties during the fighting.
