= Freemasonry in Portugal =

The first known Freemasons in Portugal were the Swiss John Coustos and two other Portuguese members of his lodge, who were arrested by the Portuguese Inquisition and questioned under torture in the 1740s. Coustos wrote a book detailing his sufferings under the Inquisition and pointed to 1728 as being the year of the first Lodge, although nothing is known of the first years of this Lodge and it was not then recognised by the Grand Lodge of England. Today there are several Masonic Obediences in Portugal.

== Grande Oriente Lusitano ==
The "Grand Orient of Lusitania", founded in 1802, is the oldest Masonic Obedience in Portugal. It is recognized by the Grand Orient de France and also belongs to CLIPSAS. The Grand Orient of Portugal is part of the liberal or continental Freemasonry tradition, proclaiming the absolute liberty of conscience and dogmatism.

=== Rites ===
Under the auspices of the Grande Oriente Lusitano there are lodges of the Ancient and Accepted Scottish Rite and of the French Rite. These Rites are administered by the respective philosophical Potences with which the Grande Oriente Lusitano has a treaty to confer the symbolic degrees:

- The Ancient and Accepted Scottish Rite for Portugal and its jurisdiction
- French Rite of Portugal (Rose-Croix)

=== Grémio Lusitano ===
The three potencies are represented in civil society through the Grémio Lusitano, a cultural, recreational and philanthropic society whose headquarters are situated at the Rua do Grémio Lusitano, number 25, in Lisbon. This building, the Masonic Palace, also hosts the Portuguese Masonic Museum, which is open to the general public.

== Grande Loja Regular de Portugal ==
The "Regular Grand Lodge of Portugal" (GLRP) was established in 1991 by the Grande Loge Nationale Française (GLNF), in an attempt to introduce regular organised Freemasonry into Portugal. Following internal disagreement, the organisation split in 1996. The founding French authority has since withdrawn recognition, and the residual GLRP enjoys very little international recognition.

== Grande Loja Legal de Portugal/GLRP ==
Following a dispute over the legality of an election to the Grand Mastership of GLRP, the party disputing the election took control of the civil association under which the Obedience had legal existence. In 1996 a large majority of the members of that body created a new civil association under the name "Grande Loja Legal de Portugal/Grande Loja Regular de Portugal" (GLLP/GLRP). The GLLP/GLRP considers itself to be entirely continuous with the Grand Lodge founded in 1991, and unconnected with the body which holds legal title to the original name, and which it considers to be a clandestine organization. This position is upheld by the regular Masonic world, which is acknowledged by the United Grand Lodge of England which prints the date "1991" in its annual Year Book after the entry for the GLLP/GLRP.

Almost all Regular Masonic jurisdictions worldwide recognise the GLLP/GLRP as the only (native) regular masonic authority in Portugal. These include the three Home Grand Lodges, which are the three original and oldest Grand Lodges in Freemasonry, the United Grand Lodge of England, the Grand Lodge of Ireland, and the Grand Lodge of Scotland.

As the rather cumbersome legal name exists chiefly for legal reasons, the Grand Lodge is often known in English as simply "The (Legal) Regular Grand Lodge of Portugal". This is the name used by the Grand Lodge of Scotland, and by the United Grand Lodge of England, although it is further shortened to just "Grand Lodge of Portugal (Legal)" on the UGLE website.

== Le Droit Humain ==
The Portuguese Federation of Le Droit Humain (Portuguese: Ordem Maçónica Mista Internacional Le Droit Humain - Federação Portuguesa) was founded in 1923 by Adelaide Cabete. After the coup d'état of 28 May 1926 the dictatorial regime Estado Novo forbade masonry in the country and the order fades away. In 1980 a new lodge is opened and a new era for the Portuguese Federation of Le Droit Humain begins.

== United Grand Lodge of England ==
On 17 April 1735 Lord Weymouth, Grand Master of the Grand Lodge of England received a petition from Brethren residing in Lisbon. This was granted and a Provincial Grand Lodge was created. The United Grand Lodge of England (UGLE) is in amity with the GLLP/GLRP, which it recognises as fully regular. However, owing to the sizeable British ex-patriate community in Portugal, there are also several UGLE lodges warranted and operating in the country. These use English rituals, and work in the English language. They are controlled directly from London, and the UGLE appoints a local Grand Inspector for day to day supervision of these English lodges.

== Other jurisdictions ==
There are several small Co-Masonic groups in Portugal including a small unrecognised jurisdiction named Grande Loja Nacional Portuguesa.
