= Louis Victor Meriadec de Rohan-Guémené =

Austrian general

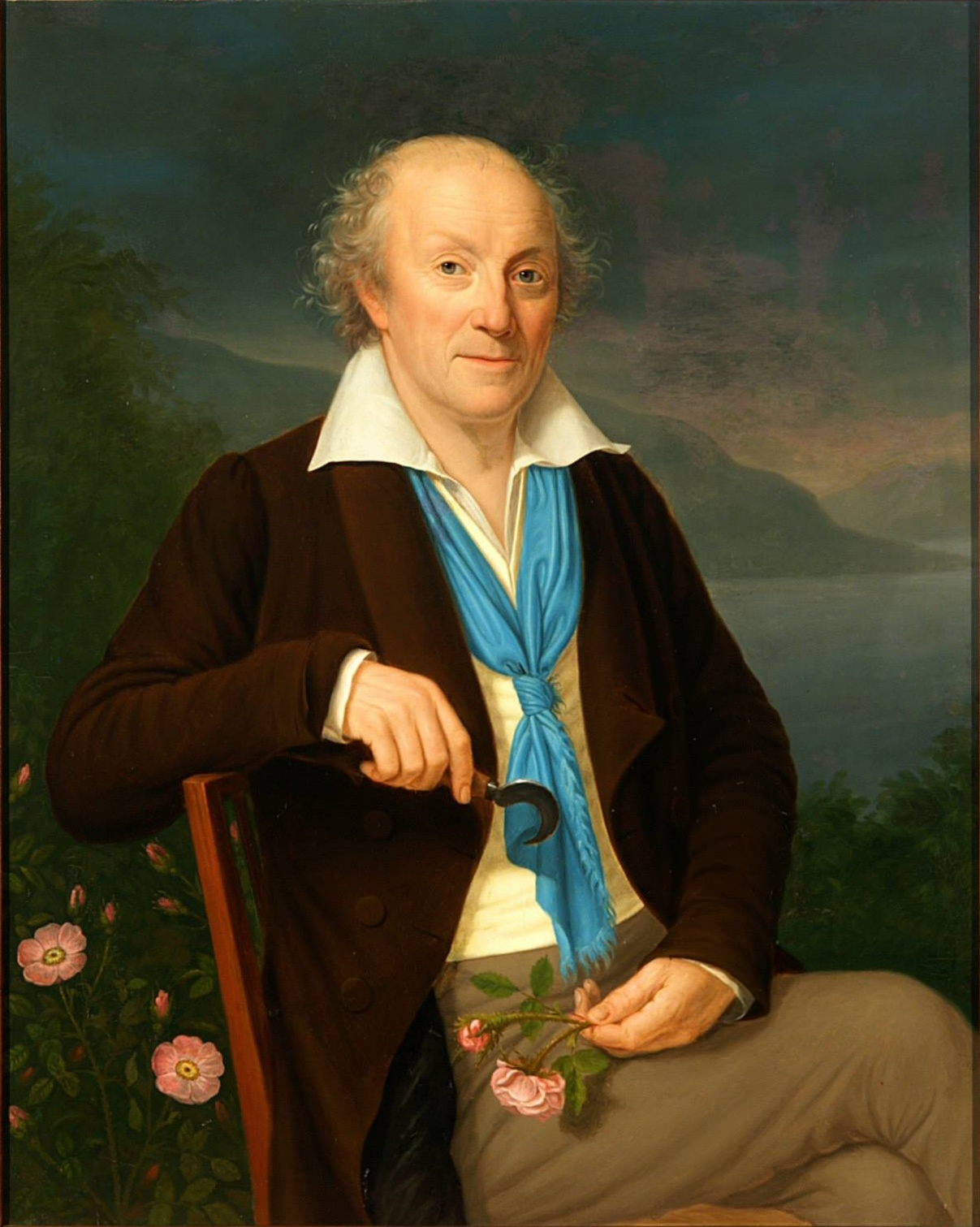
- Born: 20 July 1766; Versailles, France
- Died: 10 December 1846 (aged 80); Sychrov Castle, Czech Republic
- Military career
- Allegiance: France; Habsburg monarchy Austrian Empire
- Branch: Infantry
- Rank: Feldmarschall-Leutnant
- Conflicts: French Revolutionary Wars; Flanders campaign (1794); Napoleonic Wars; Battle of Castelfranco Veneto (1805); Battle of Aspern-Essling (1809); Battle of Wagram (1809)
- Awards: Military Order of Maria Theresa
- Other work: Inhaber Infantry Regiment Nr. 21

Louis Victor Meriadec de Rohan, Prince de Guémené, Duke of Montbazon and Bouillon (20 July 1766 – 10 December 1846), was a French aristocrat who fled France at the start of the French Revolution. He fought in the army of Habsburg Austria and the Austrian Empire in the French Revolutionary Wars and the Napoleonic Wars. Cut off behind enemy lines in 1805, he led his troops on a remarkable but ultimately unsuccessful trek through the Alps and Italy. In 1809, he commanded a division at the Battle of Aspern-Essling and the Battle of Wagram and was seriously wounded in the latter action. He briefly served as inhaber (proprietor) of an infantry regiment but retired from military service in 1810. He died on the Rohan family's Bohemian estate in 1846.

== French Revolution ==
Louis-Victor-Meriadec de Rohan, Prince de Guémené, Duke de Montbazon et de Bouillon, was born at Versailles, France on 20 July 1766. He was the son of Henri Louis de Rohan and his distant cousin Victoire de Rohan.
When the French Revolution broke out, he left France and took service with the Habsburg Austrian army. He was promoted Oberst (colonel) in October 1794. The Rohan Legion was formed in 1794 from Walloons and French émigrés. The Legion consisted of an infantry regiment of 12 infantry companies and a hussar regiment of 6 squadrons. Its commander was listed as Ludwig (Louis) Prince Rohan. The unit was technically part of the Brunswick imperial contingent. (Note: Wrede confusingly identified the Rohan Legion commandant as Victor and the Inhaber as Ludwig (Louis). (Wrede 1898b, p. 449))

The Rohan Light Infantry, 504 men, and the Rohan Hussars, 6 squadrons, appear in the order of battle for the army of Prince Frederick, Duke of York and Albany on 15 August 1794. Both units served in von Linsingen's 1st Brigade of Rudolph von Hammerstein's Advance Guard. The Rohan Hussars were also part of the garrison at the Siege of Nijmegen on 1 November 1794. In 1798, the Legion was dissolved and the infantry reformed as two Austrian light infantry battalions, while the cavalry became part of the Bussy Mounted Jägers. Charles Alain Gabriel de Rohan-Guémené, the older brother of Louis, commanded Light Infantry Battalion Nr. 2 and Louis commanded Light Infantry Battalion Nr. 14. Louis distinguished himself during the War of the Second Coalition, fighting at the Battle of Cassano and at the Gotthard Pass and Simplon Pass in 1799. He also fought in the south of Tyrol in 1800. Rohan was promoted to Generalmajor on 23 January 1801. Later, Light Infantry Battalion Nr. 14 was commanded by Conrad Reichenstein before being disbanded in 1801 and the soldiers incorporated into Archduke Franz Joseph Infantry Regiment Nr. 63. In 1802, he married his niece, Bertha de Rohan-Guémené (1782–1841), the daughter of his older brother, Charles.

== 1805 ==
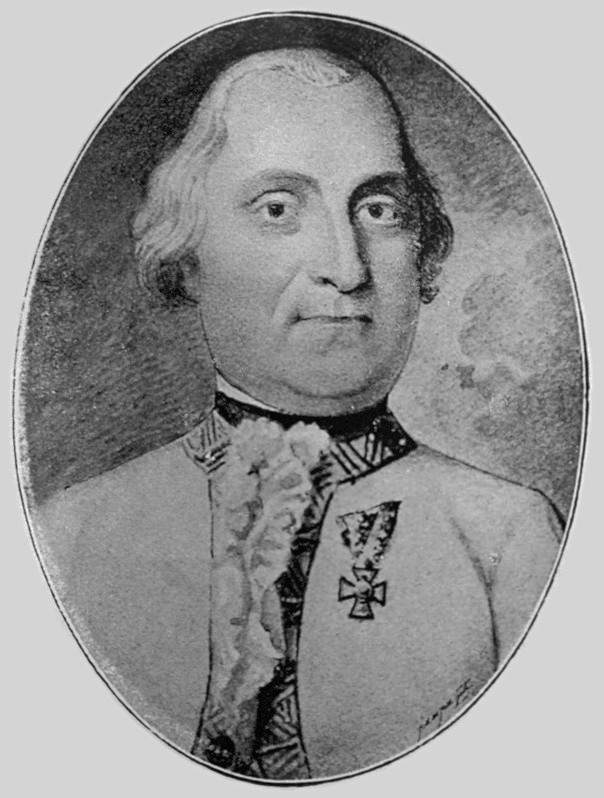
Franz Jellacic

The start of the War of the Third Coalition found Rohan in command of a brigade in the County of Tyrol. At the beginning of September 1805, he led 6 battalions and 2 cavalry squadrons at Glurns. Rohan's 3,200-strong brigade consisted of 5 battalions of the Franz Kinsky Infantry Regiment Nr. 47, 1 battalion of Tyrol Jägers, and 2 squadrons of the Hohenzollern Chevau-léger Regiment Nr. 2. By 23 September, forces led by Franz Jellacic, Charles de Rohan, and Christian Wolfskehl von Reichenberg moved into Lindau, Isny im Allgäu, and Feldkirch. When word was received the Napoleon had attacked the Austrian army in Bavaria with a large army, 14 battalions were sent north as reinforcements. Louis Victor Rohan was ordered to send the Franz Kinsky Regiment to Landeck and he was given the Duka Infantry Regiment Nr. 39 as a replacement.

In early October 1805, Jellacic's forces were ordered to march north from the Vorarlberg to join the main army near Ulm. An order of battle from 8 October showed that Jellacic commanded a corps consisting of three brigades at Ulm. Jellacic managed to escape the debacle of the Ulm campaign by marching back to the Vorarlberg before he could be cut off. Jellacic reached Isny im Allgäu and Lindau with 5,495 infantry and 915 cavalry on 16 October. At this time, Rohan again assumed command over the Franz Kinsky Regiment at Reutte. Rohan reported that a French corps under Marshal Michel Ney was approaching. At first, Archduke John of Austria commanding the local army believed he could hold his present positions. When John finally ordered Jellacic to retreat from the area and join Rohan at Reutte, Jellacic argued against it and did not promptly carry out his instructions.

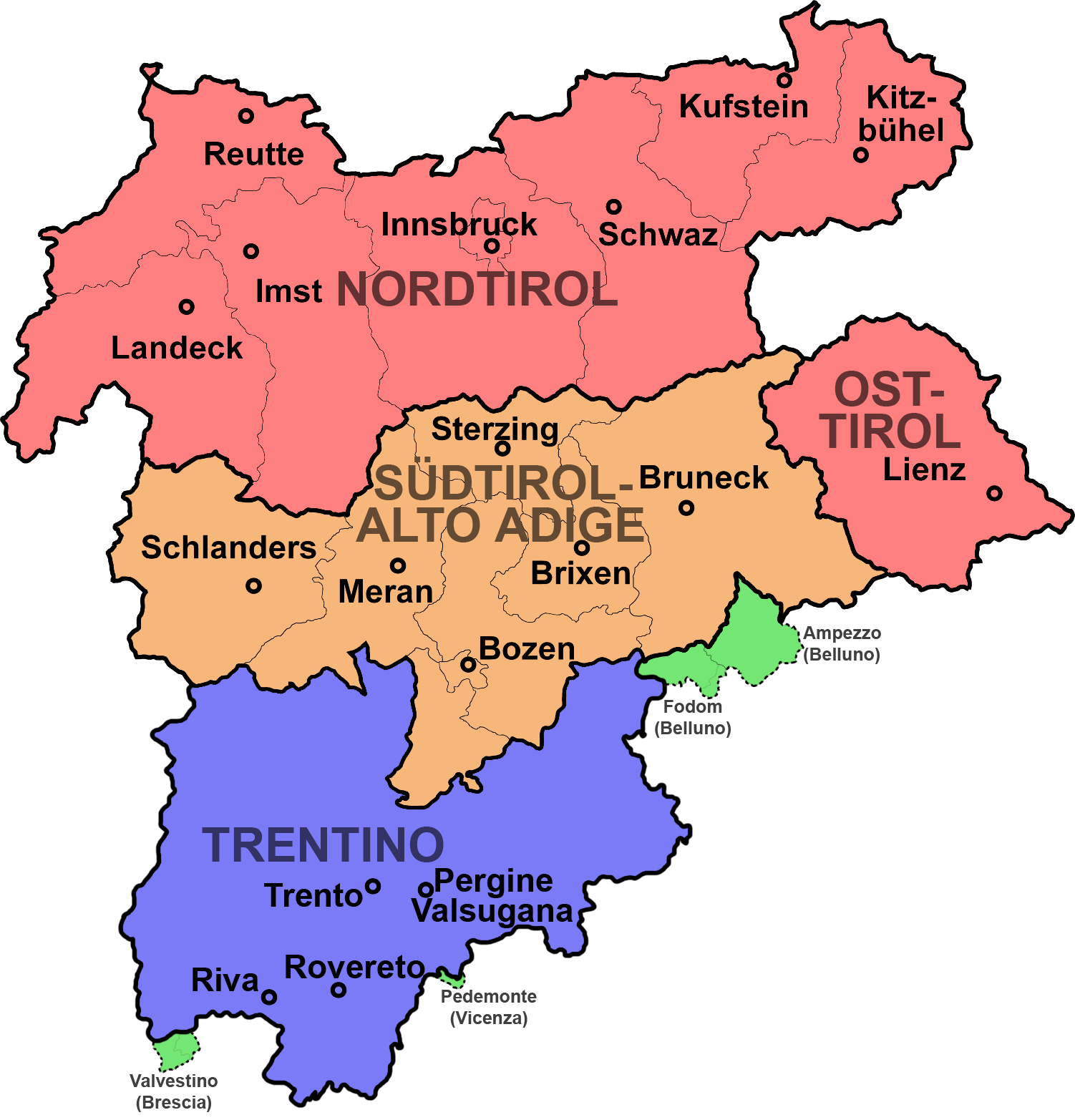
Map shows where Rohan's brigade operated in 1805. It was initially posted at Reutte, but then moved to Imst, Landeck, Schlanders, Bolzano (Bozen), and Trento before turning east into the Valsugana.

On 5 November 1805, Archduke John learned that Ney was in possession of the Scharnitz and Leutasch passes and there was nothing keeping him from seizing Innsbruck. The escape routes were closing fast. Jellacic fortified his position while asking Rohan, who retreated to Imst, to hold open his eastern escape route. On 9 November, Rohan received a peremptory order from John to retreat to Brixen, without waiting for Jellacic. On 10 November, Rohan marched from Landeck south to Nauders with 7 battalions, 10 squadrons, and 5 guns, a total of 4,400 men. That day, he received word that Johann von Hiller's division had already left Bolzano (Bozen). After pausing for a day, Rohan's brigade marched south to Glurns on 12 November and east to Schlanders on 13 November. Finding on 14–15 November that Archduke John's army had abandoned the Tyrol, Rohan determined to march across northeastern Italy to Venice.

Rohan's brigade seized Bolzano on 18 November and the next day moved south to Neumarkt. On 20 November, the brigade entered Trento before turning east into the Valsugana. It passed through Borgo on 21 November and Primolano the following day. On 23 November, Rohan's brigade stormed into Bassano del Grappa routing elements of Jean-Mathieu Seras' division. Laurent de Gouvion Saint-Cyr who was besieging Venice heard about Rohan's incursion and sent Jean Reynier's division to intercept it. Late on 23 November, Rohan reached Castelfranco Veneto where he wrecked a supply base for the French Army of Italy. On 24 November, Rohan began marching toward Piombino Dese when he encountered Reynier's division blocking his way at 8:00 am.

In the Battle of Castelfranco Veneto, Rohan's brigade began pressing back Reynier's right flank. Meanwhile, Saint-Cyr marched to Camposampiero with three infantry battalions and sent his Polish cavalry to Cittadella. Hearing the noise of the battle, Saint-Cyr marched toward Castelfranco, reached a point in the rear of Rohan's brigade, and attacked. Rohan threw his last reserve at Saint-Cyr's force but was wounded soon after. With Rohan out of action, the Austrians lost heart and surrendered. The Austrians lost 620 killed and wounded and surrendered 3,780 men and 5 guns. The French lost about 600 casualties out of 9,000 soldiers and 12 guns. The surrendered units were 4 battalions of the Duka Infantry Regiment Nr. 39, the 2nd and 4th Battalions of the Beaulieu Infantry Regiment Nr. 58, 8 squadrons of the Kronprinz Cuirassier Regiment Nr. 4, 2 squadrons of the Hohenzollern Chevau-léger Regiment Nr. 2, 1 combined infantry battalion, 1 combined cavalry squadron, and 5 guns. (Note: Smith numbered the Duka Regiment as 38. According to Wrede, it was 39. (Wrede 1898a, p. 394) The Kronprinz Cuirassier Regiment Nr. 4 was also known as Archduke Ferdinand Regiment. (Bowden & Tarbox, p. 71)) For his exploit, Rohan received the Knight's Cross of the Military Order of Maria Theresa on 28 May 1806.

== Later career ==
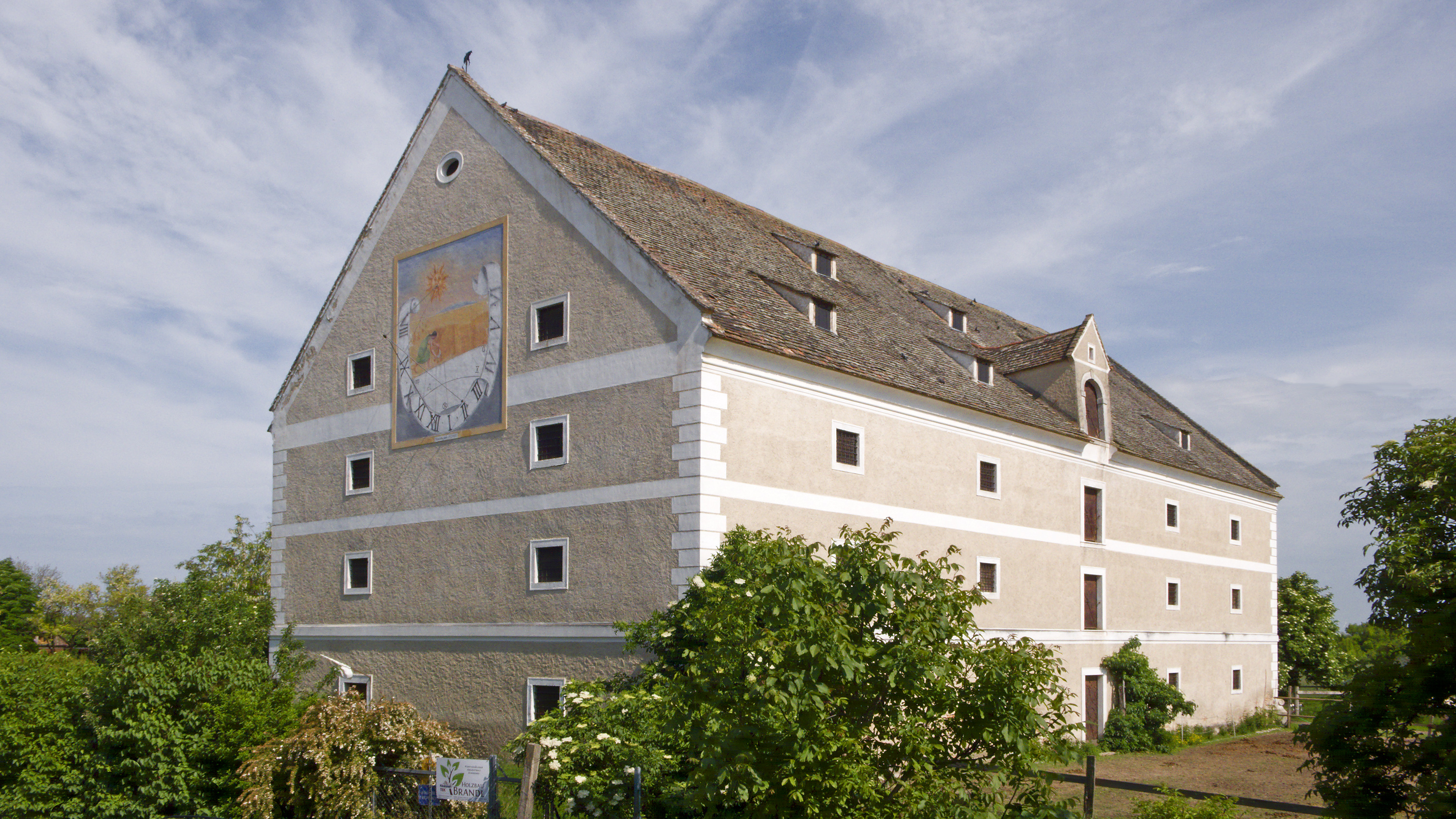
Essling Granary

In 1808, Rohan was appointed Inhaber (proprietor) of Infantry Regiment Nr. 21. The previous Inhaber was Sigmund von Gemmingen-Hornberg who died, leaving the position vacant in 1807–1808. On 4 May 1809, Rohan was promoted to Feldmarschall-Leutnant at the start of the War of the Fifth Coalition. At the Battle of Eckmühl, he commanded a brigade consisting of 12 grenadier battalions and 16 guns in the I Reservekorps. In the Battle of Aspern-Essling on 21–22 May 1809, Rohan led a division in the IV Armeekorps under Franz Seraph of Orsini-Rosenberg. The division numbered over 10,000 men and included four infantry regiments, one Grenz infantry regiment, two light cavalry regiments, one landwehr battalion, one freikorps, and 22 guns organized in three artillery batteries. On the first day, IV Armeekorps assaulted the village of Essling without success. On the second day, Rosenberg's corps finally seized Essling in the afternoon, except for the granary. However, units of the French Imperial Guard recaptured the village. Napoleon was defeated, though at the cost of 26,700 Austrian casualties. French losses were roughly the same.

At the Battle of Wagram on 5–6 July 1809, Rohan commanded a division in Rosenberg's reorganized IV Armeekorps. The division counted 5,368 infantry and 14 guns. It consisted of the Archduke Ludwig Infantry Regiment Nr. 8, Koburg Infantry Regiment Nr. 22, two landwehr battalions, and two artillery batteries. On the first day, the Austrian army repulsed the French attacks. On the second day, IV Armeekorps was driven back and Archduke Charles, Duke of Teschen ordered a retreat. Near the end of the fighting, Rohan was seriously wounded by a bullet in the abdomen. He retired from military service in 1810 and retired to his estate. He was succeeded as Inhaber of Infantry Regiment Nr. 21 by Albert Gyulay. He died at Sychrov Castle on 10 December 1846.

== Titles and succession ==
In 1802, he married his niece, Bertha de Rohan-Guémené (1782–1841), the only daughter of his older brother, Charles. They had no children.

Upon the death of his older brother in 1836, he became the head of the House of Rohan, Duke of Bouillon, Prince of Guémené, and Duke of Montbazon. Upon his death in 1846, the titles passed to his nephew Camille Philippe Joseph Idesbald de Rohan, son of his sister Marie-Louise Thérèse.

== Notes ==
Footnotes

Citations

Military offices
| Preceded by none | Inhaber of Rohan Legion; 1794–1797 | Succeeded by none |
| Preceded by none | Commander of Light Infantry Battalion Nr. 14; 1798–1801 | Succeeded by Conrad Reichenstein |
| Preceded by Sigmund von Gemmingen | Inhaber of Infantry Regiment Nr. 21; 1808–1810 | Succeeded by Albert Gyulay |
