= John Coustos =

Swiss businessman

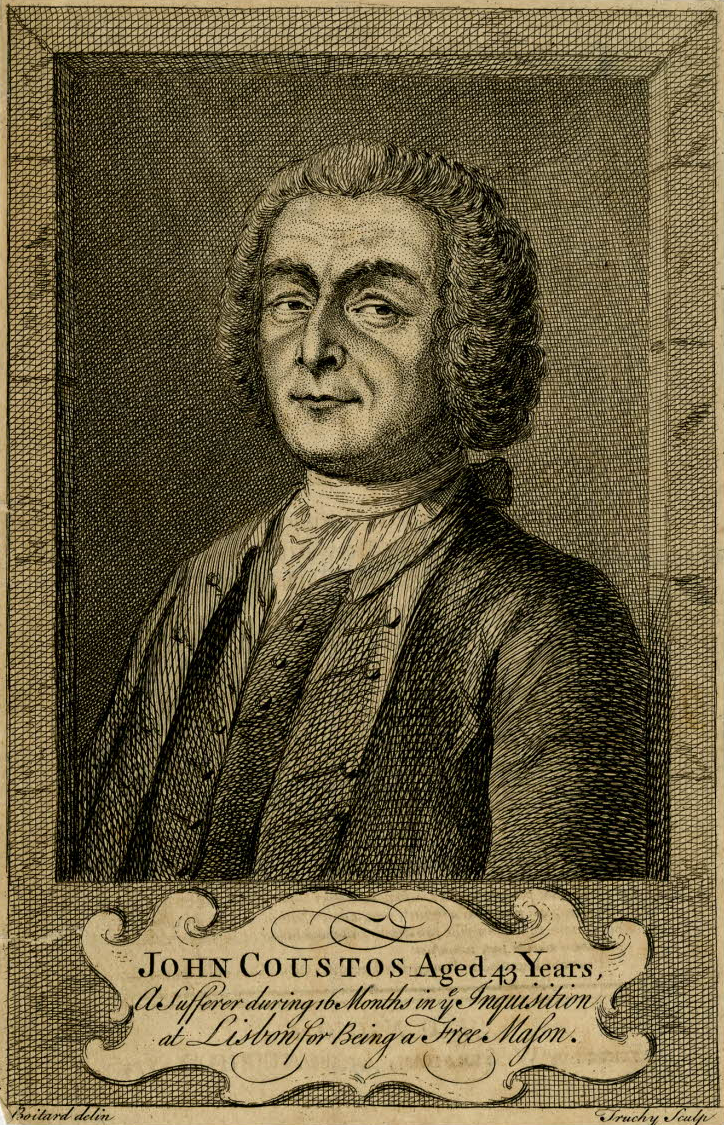
John Coustos

John Coustos (1703 in Bern – 1746) was an 18th-century Swiss businessman living in England. Coustos is primarily known for his involvement with Freemasonry after joining the Premier Grand Lodge of England in London (where he was allegedly a spy for British Whig Prime Minister, Robert Walpole). He subsequently was active in Freemasonry in Lisbon and came into conflict with the Portuguese Inquisition. The fallout in the aftermath of this was a major event in the struggle between Catholicism and Freemasonry.

== Biography ==
=== Freemasonry in England ===
Coustos became a Freemason around 1728-29 and was a member of the Premier Grand Lodge of England, while living in London. The modern scholar Marsha Keith Schuchard, claims that Coustos, "acted as a secret agent for Walpole," the Whig Prime Minister of Britain. Schuchard claims that Coustos, allegedly of Marrano descent, who came to London in the aftermath of the public fallout of the Francis Francia trial (a Sephardic "Jacobite Jew", who was involved in Freemasonry) caught the eye of the British government. Prime Minister Walpole, a stalwart of the new Hanoverian regime, allegedly used Coustos (and other spies such as Michel de la Roche) to spy on French masonic lodges in London from 1730 to 1732 and report back on any activities of exiled Jacobites in Paris.

=== Portuguese Inquisition ===
While traveling on business he founded a Masonic lodge in Lisbon and was arrested by the Portuguese Inquisition. After questioning he was sentenced to the galleys. Three Portuguese Masons were put to death. He was released in 1744 as a result of the intercession of George II of Great Britain. After his release and return to England, Coustos wrote a book detailing his experiences in the hands of the Inquisition.

== Works ==
- John Coustos: The Sufferings of John Coustos for Freemasonry and for His Refusing to Turn Roman Catholic in the Inquisition, Kessinger Publishing, ISBN 1-4179-4187-1

The original publication of Sufferings of John Coustos was published in 1746. It was printed by W Strahan who at the time was the printer to George II. The original book is dedicated to the Earl of Harrington, who was one of his majesty's principal secretaries of state.
