= Portuguese Legion (Napoleonic Wars) =

French Imperial Army unit (1807–1814)

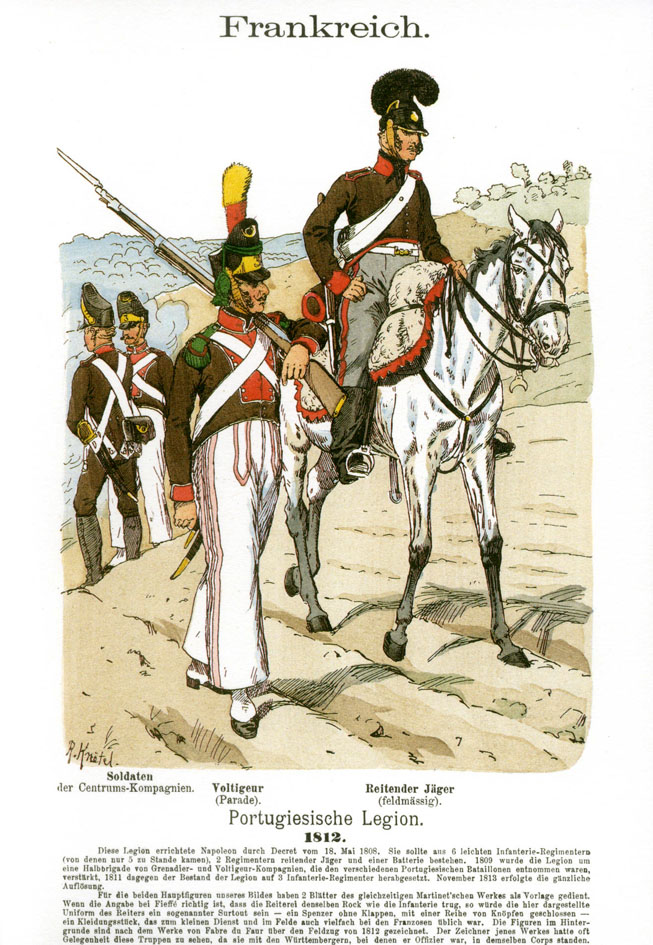
- Soldiers of the Portuguese Legion
- Active: 12 November 1807
- Disbanded: 5 May 1814
- Country: First French Empire
- Branch: French Imperial Army
- Size: Largest at 17 infantry battalions, 16 cavalry squadrons, and 2 artillery companies
- Part of: Imperial Foreign Troops
- Engagements: Napoleonic Wars; Battle of Wagram; French Invasion of Russia; Battle of Smolensk; Battle of Borodino; Battle of Berezina

Commanders
- Notable commanders: Pedro de Almeida Portugal

The Portuguese Legion (French: Légion portugaise; Portuguese: Legião Portuguesa) was a 9,000 men strong Portuguese military unit integrated in the army of the First French Empire, formed after the French occupation of Portugal in 1807.

The Legion was created by order of Napoleon from 12 November 1807. Organization began in February 1808, with the best units of the disbanded Portuguese Army, including the elite Legion of Light Troops. It set out for Salamanca in April 1808, crossing Spain until arriving in France. During the crossing of Spain, many of its soldiers defected, returning to Portugal and joining the Portuguese resistance against French occupation.

The Portuguese Legion took part in the French campaigns in Germany, Austria and Russia, suffering heavy casualties. It fought at the battles of Wagram, Smolensk, Borodino (Moscow) and Berezina.

The Legion was disbanded on 5 May 1814, with only about 1,000 of its original 9,000 soldiers surviving and returning to Portugal.

== Organization ==
The Portuguese Legion was organized as a division, originally including:

- Five light infantry regiments
- A battalion of chasseurs à pied
- Three regiments of chasseurs à cheval
- An artillery battery
- An infantry depot battalion
- A cavalry depot squadron

For the 1809 campaign, the 13th elite demi-brigade was created, with three battalions, made from elements of the several infantry regiments of the Legion. The 13th demi-brigade was part of Nicolas Oudinot's II Corps.

In 1811, the Portuguese Legion was reorganized in:

- Three infantry regiments
- A regiment of chasseurs à cheval
- A depot battalion

In 1813, after suffering heavy casualties, the remains of the Legion were organized as:

- A battalion de guerre
- A depot battalion
