= Jean Reynier =

Swiss-French military officer (1771–1814)

Count of the Empire Jean Louis Ebénézer Reynier
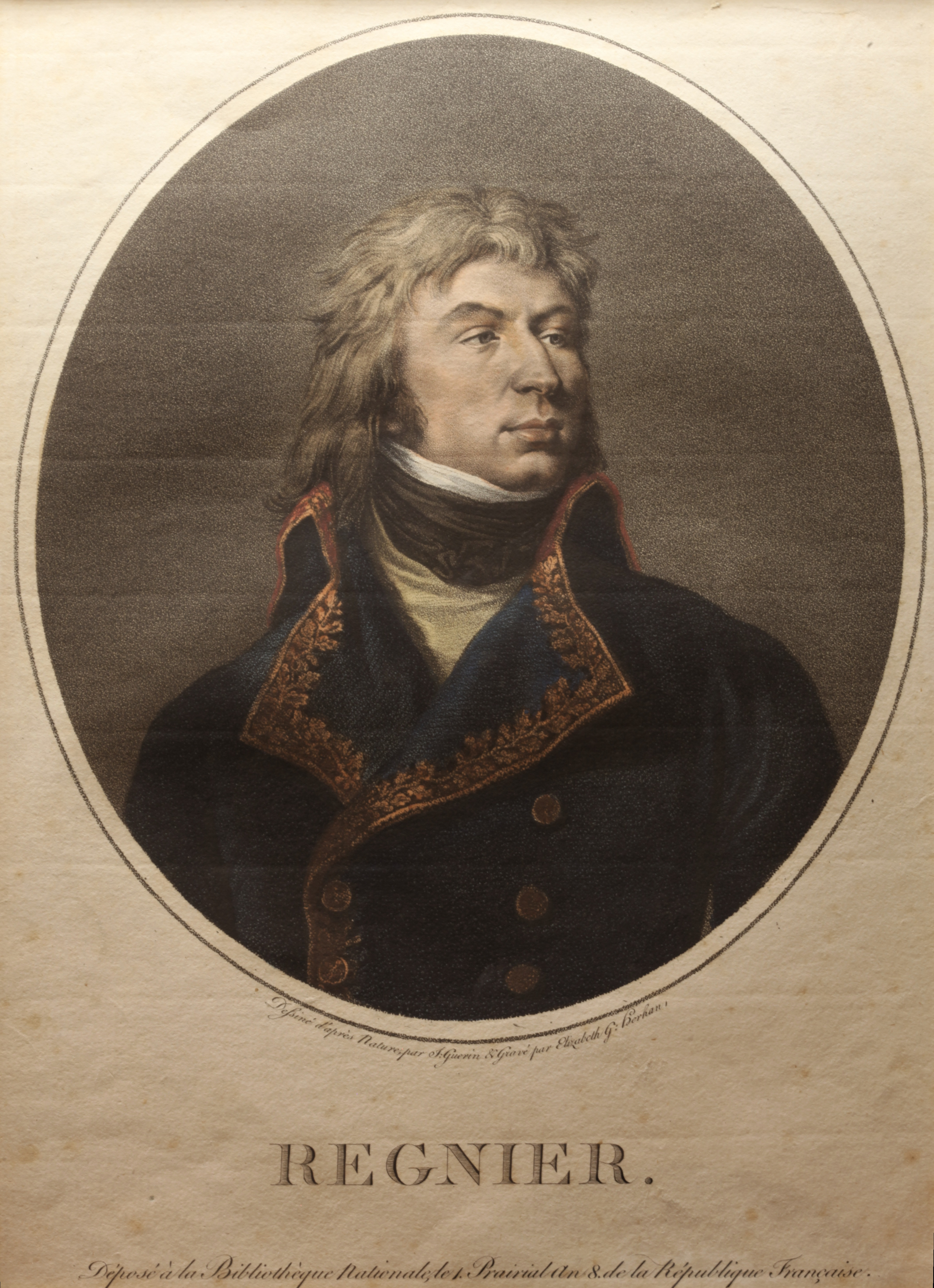
- Engraved portrait of Reynier (1800)
- Born: 14 January 1771; Lausanne, Switzerland
- Died: 27 February 1814 (aged 43); Paris, France
- Burial place: Panthéon
- Military career
- Allegiance: French First Republic; First French Empire
- Branch: French Army
- Service years: 1792–1814
- Rank: General of Division
- Conflicts: French Revolutionary Wars; Napoleonic Wars; • Battle of Castelfranco Veneto; • Battle of Campo Tenese; • Battle of Maida; • Battle of Mileto; • Battle of Kobrin; • Battle of Wolkowisk; • Battle of Großbeeren

Jean Louis Ébénézer Reynier (French pronunciation: [ʒɑ̃ lwi ebeneze ʁɛnje]; 14 January 1771 – 27 February 1814) was a Swiss-French military officer who served in the French Army during the French Revolutionary Wars and the Napoleonic Wars. He rose in rank to become a general during the War of the First Coalition, and led a division under Napoleon Bonaparte in the French campaign in Egypt and Syria. Under the First Empire, Reynier continued to hold important combat commands, eventually leading an army corps during the Peninsular War in 1810–1811, playing a minor role in the invasion of Russia and then seeing action in Germany all during the War of the Sixth Coalition.

== Background and education ==
Reynier was born on 14 January 1771 in Lausanne, Vaud, Switzerland. He was the son of Jacques François Reynier, a physician, and Caroline Chapuis. Through his father, Reynier descended from French Huguenots from the Dauphiné who fled to Switzerland after the revocation of the Edict of Nantes. His brother Jean-Louis-Antoine Reynier (1762–1824), a naturalist and archeologist, held government posts in the French administration in Egypt and Naples.

In March 1790, Reynier entered the École des ponts et chaussées in Paris. He was granted French citizenship through the 1791 constitution, which guaranteed right of return to descendants of French individuals who had fled the country due to religious persecution under the ancien régime.

== French Revolutionary Wars ==
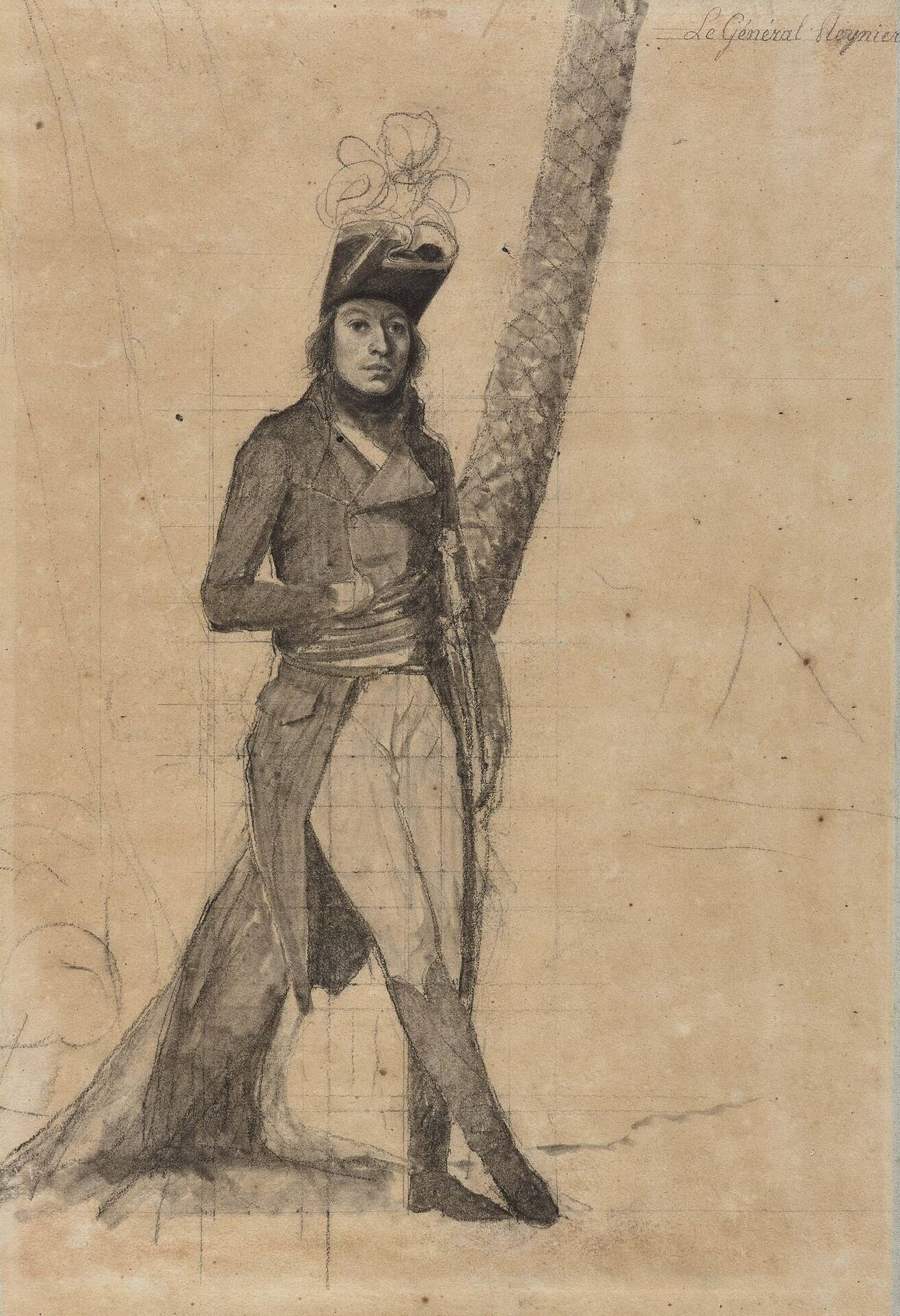
Reynier during the French campaign in Egypt and Syria. Sketch portrait by André Dutertre, c. 1798

=== Early military career (1792-1798) ===
Reynier joined the French Army as a gunner in 1792 and was drafted in October into the Army of the North, in which he saw action at the Battle of Jemappes that year, then the at the siege of Maastricht and the Battle of Neerwinden in 1793.

He saw rapid promotion appointed by the representatives of the people Bentabole and Delmas adjutant general battalion commander, on 5 September 1793. Followed soon after by appointed by the representative of the people Florent Guiot [Fr] as adjutant general brigade commander and chief of staff of the General Joseph Souham's division in the Army of the North, on 17 February 1794.

In June 1794 he refused further promotion to brigadier general, claiming he was too young. He would see service in the conquest of Holland, including action at the crossing of the frozen Waal river on 10 January 1795. He would eventually accept a promotion to brigadier general, on 13 January. And undertook a provisional appointment as chief of staff of the Army of the North in place of Liébert [Fr], at the end of March before resuming command of his brigade upon the arrival of Nicolas Ernault des Bruslys, on 13 July.

He was promoted to brigade general in January 1795, and received the assignment of chief of staff of the Army of the Rhine and Moselle under Moreau in March 1796, soon promoted yet again to general of division in November of the same year but retaining the staff role.

=== Expedition to Egypt and fall from favour (1798–1803) ===
The Peace of Leoben saw a pause in fighting in Europe and Reynier secured a position in Napoleon's Army of the Orient as a divisional general.

Participating in the conquest of Malta and the following Egyptian campaign in 1798, commanding a division at the Battle of the Pyramids and, in 1799, at the sieges of El Arish and Acre. Later, under the command of General Jacques-Francois Menou he defended against the British counter-invasion of Egypt in 1801. His division was present but not engaged in the Battle of Alexandria.

Reynier openly opposed General-in-Chief Jacques-François Menou, who had him arrested in Alexandria by General Jacques Zacharie Destaing [Fr], on 14 May and sent back to France on the Lodi landing at Nice on 28 June. Reynier would then be dismissed from service but sent home with active pay on 31 July. Reynier would published a work on Egypt in which he criticized Menou (the work was seized by order of the First Consul Bonaparte). Following this controversy he would kill General Destaing in a duel in Paris on 5 May 1802. For this he would fall further out of favour and be exiled from Paris in Nièvre.

== Napoleonic Wars ==
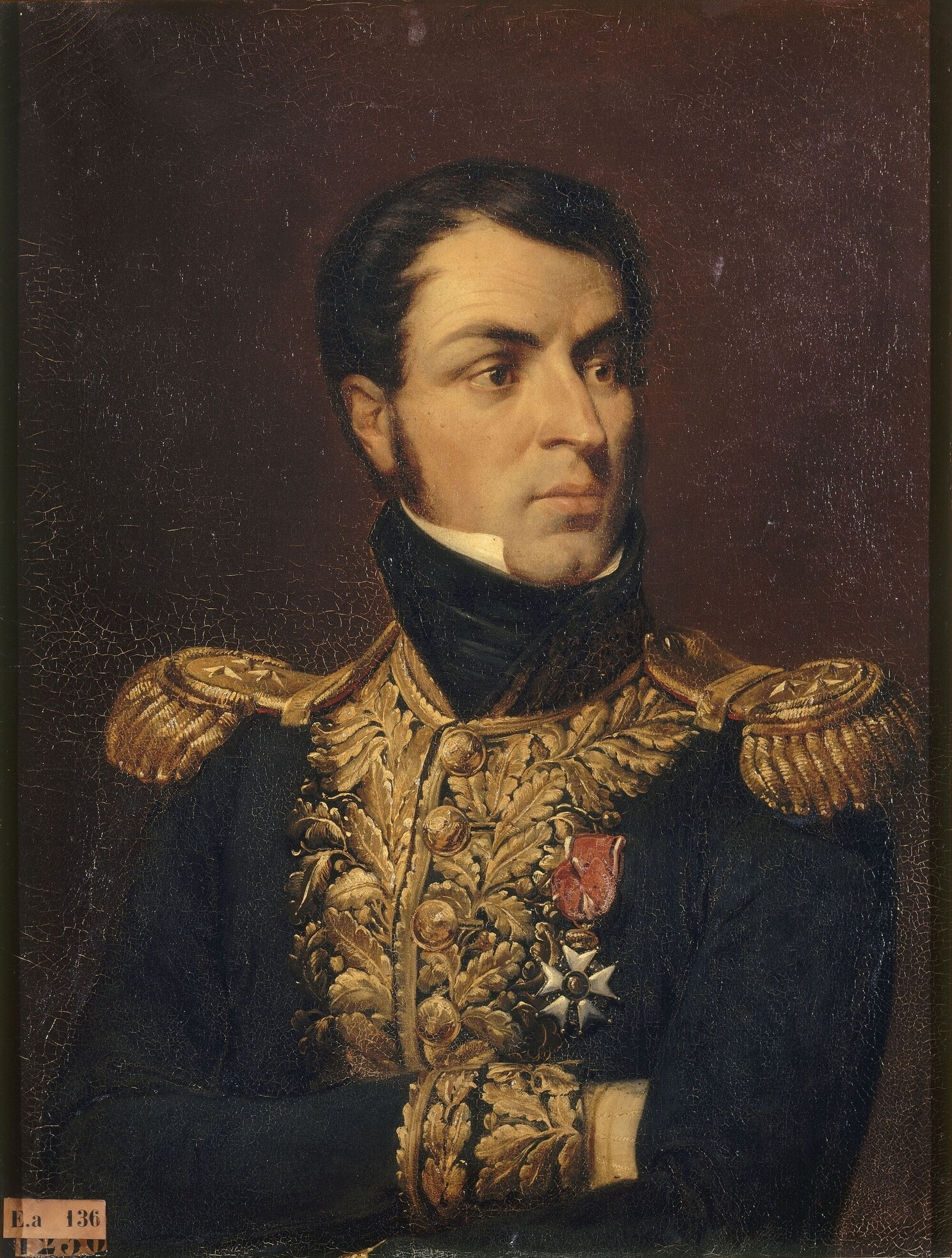
Portrait by Félix Philippoteaux, 1836

=== Army of Naples (1804–1808) ===
He would return to duty in Italy in the Naples observation corps under General Gouvion-Saint-Cyr in late 1804. The next year Reynier his 2nd Division helped capture Louis Victor Meriadec de Rohan's 4,400 Austrians at the Battle of Castelfranco Veneto. He would be elevated to command the right wing of the Army of Naples under André Masséna where he laid siege to Gaeta on 12 February. Commanding the 2nd Corps comprising his own and Jean-Antoine Verdier division he was tasked with conquering Calabria.

On 24 November 1805, Reynier's 6,000 Frenchmen routed the 10,000-man army of the Bourbon Kingdom of Naples and Sicily at the Battle of Campo Tenese on 9 March 1806. This victory helped Napoleon to install his brother Joseph Bonaparte on the throne of the newly created Napoleonic Kingdom of Naples. On 4 July of that year, a British raiding force inflicted a severe drubbing on an overconfident Reynier at the Battle of Maida in southern Italy. Reynier was later able to reassert French control of the area via the French victory at Mileto, captured Cotrone and besieging Scylla. Reynier would go on to serve under King Joseph as his Minister of War and Marine as well as head of the Army of Naples succeeding Marshal Masséna.

=== Later campaigns in Germany, Spain (1809–1814) ===
Reynier was called to the Grand Armée and fought at the Battle of Wagram in 1809, where Reynier commanded 129 artillery pieces and 8,475 soldiers on the Island of Lobau. This impressive array of cannon helped stop a dangerous flanking attack by Johann von Klenau's Austrian VI Armeekorps.

Sent to the Iberian Peninsula in 1810, he commanded the II Corps in the Army of Portugal under his old chief Masséna at fighting at the Battle of Bussaco, the Lines of Torres Vedras, and the Battle of Sabugal in Portugal. Before Bussaco, Reynier and other generals urged Masséna to order the assault which turned out to be unsuccessful.

His corps was not seriously engaged at the Battle of Fuentes de Onoro in Spain when he commanded the right wing.

In honour of years of service in 1811, Napoleon named him a Count of the Empire, he was also named Grand Dignitary of the Order of the Two Sicilies.

Reynier was recalled from Spain for the Russian campaign of 1812, leading VII Corps composed of Saxon troops. Together with an allied Austrian force under Karl Schwarzenberg, he operated well to the south of the major fighting. After victorious but inconclusive battles with the Russians at Gorodeczna and Wolkowysk and a minor defeat at Lapenitza, he retreated when he learned of the main army's disaster.

Leading the Saxon corps plus an attached French division, Reynier fought at the battles of Kalish, Bautzen, Grossbeeren and Dennewitz in 1813. During the Battle of Leipzig, his Saxon troops suddenly changed sides. When a key bridge was blown up too quickly, Reynier was trapped and captured with his remaining French soldiers.

== Death and legacy ==
Reynier was released after being exchanged for the Austrian general Maximilian von Merveldt, also captured at Leipzig, and arrived in Paris on 15 February 1814. He died of gout nearly two weeks later, on 27 February. Pastor Paul-Henri Marron presided over his funeral at the Oratoire du Louvre on 10 March with Reynier then buried in the Panthéon.

His name is inscribed in column 24 on the southern pillar of the Arc de Triomphe as REYNIER, right above that of fellow Vaudois volunteer Laharpe.

== Honours ==
- France: Grand Officer of the Legion of Honour.
- France: Grand Cordon of the Order of the Reunion.
- Naples: Grand Dignitary of the Royal Order of the Two-Sicilies.
- Saxony: Grand Cross of the Military Order of St. Henry.
