= Francesco Landi (general) =

Two Sicilian Brigadier General

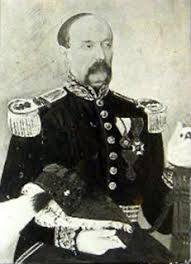
- Born: 13 October 1792; Naples, Kingdom of Sicily
- Died: 2 February 1861 (aged 68); Naples, Kingdom of the Two Sicilies
- Spouse: Raffaella De Marinis (m. 1818–1861)
- Military career
- Allegiance: (Kingdom of Naples) Naples; Two Sicilies
- Branch: Army of the Kingdom of Naples; Army of the Two Sicilies
- Service years: 1806–1820; 1833–1860
- Rank: Brigadier General
- Conflicts: Neapolitan War; Siege of Ancona; Expedition of the Thousand; Battle of Calatafimi

Francesco Landi was a Brigadier General from the Kingdom of the Two Sicilies. He was the main commander at the Battle of Calatafimi against Garibaldi's Redshirts during the Expedition of the Thousand.

== Biography ==
Francesco was the son of Antonio Landi who was an officer of the army of the Kingdom of the Two Sicilies and Raimonda Buonocore, daughter of an officer of the Army of the Two Sicilies, he had 6 brothers, of whom four (Donato, Luigi, Giovanni and Nicola) would follow a military career, while Giuseppe would practice a legal career and Gennaro would take his vows.

Francesco Landi was admitted at 14 as a pupil of the Nunziatella Military School at the beginning of the French rule of Naples. Landi and his pupils were first assigned to a regiment as volunteers, to then become graduates of the troops, non-commissioned officers and finally second-lieutenants. Landi was first assigned as a volunteer to the 3rd line infantry regiment and then became a second lieutenant in November 1809.

Joachim Murat had been sitting on the throne of Naples since 1 August 1808 and organized an expeditionary force made up of 20,000 French and 8,000 Neapolitans to attempt an invasion of Sicily against Ferdinand III of Sicily and quell the brigandage in Calabria, fomented in turn by loyalists of Ferdinand III. Francesco Landi participated in the expedition with the 3rd line regiment until 1813 when as a lieutenant he was assigned to the 8th line regiment.

He participated in the Siege of Ancona in 1814 and in Joachim Murat's campaign against the Austrians until the defeat at Tolentino on May 2, 1815, after having received promotion to captain and the knight's cross of the Royal Order of the Two-Sicilies.

With the defeat of Murat at the Battle of Tolentino, Ferdinand III of Sicily was restored to the throne of Naples and united his two kingdoms the following year, becoming Ferdinand I of the Two Sicilies. Captain Landi, according to the Treaty of Casalanza, maintained his rank and position by taking an oath of loyalty to Ferdinand I. Under the new Bourbon regime, Francesco Landi, confirmed in the rank of captain, was assigned in 1816 to the 3rd regiment of the Regina line, stationed in Bari. The Murattian and Sicilian officers, until recently on opposite fields, were to now live together in a condition of hostile rivalry which would tend to worsen following some divisive measures of the Bourbon government. The decorations of the Royal Order of the Two Sicilies would be a divisive sign between the two factions and this would generate an underground discontent among the Murattian officers which lead to the joining of some of these officers of Carbonari lodges. However there were no records of Francesco Landi's involvement in these Carbonari lodges, even if Landi adhered to the constitutional movement of 1820–21 with which Ferdinand I was forced to grant the constitution, then revoked a few months later with the help of the Austrians.

In 1818 Francesco Landi married Raffaella De Marinis, belonging to a noble family from Campania and had five children who would serve first in the Two Sicilian army, to then be re-enlisted in the Royal Italian Army.

Landi would participate in the Carbonari uprisings of 1820–1821, where his regiment would be distinguished by the numerous desertions and acts of indiscipline. Following the end of the constitutional regime, with the help of the Austrian army which remained as an occupation force at the expense of the Kingdom of the Two Sicilies, the national army was dissolved with a criminal trial for the officers most involved and an examination of the service record for the others. Following this examination, which would assess political rather than military conduct, Landi was ordered into exile, together with other officers. The Kingdom of the Two Sicilies, in the absence of a national army, was dependant on the Imperial Austrian Army and on the formation of Swiss regiments.

A turning point in the military policy of the Kingdom of the Two Sicilies took place with the ascent to the throne of Ferdinand II who passionate about the military and with sympathy for the veterans of the Napoleonic campaigns excluded with the purge of 1821, who started the formation of a national army rescuing from the Murattian veterans and the Sicilian army cadres in which the ancient practice of the sale of degrees was still taking place. In this renewal, in 1832, Landi was recalled among the officers in reserve, only to be employed in operational departments only in 1838. In 1840 he was assigned to the 2nd Hunters Battalion where he remained for eight years as captain.

In 1848 he was assigned to the 3rd Prince Regiment which was engaged in the repression of a revolt against the Bourbon regime in Calabria, receiving for his services the knight's cross of the Royal Order of Francis I. He will not participate in the campaign for the recovery of Sicily in the period 1848–49.

In 1849 he was promoted to major and transferred to the 1st King Regiment and was then promoted to lieutenant colonel and commanded the 9th Hunters Battalion and in 1856, to the 6th Farnese Infantry Regiment stationed in Palermo, before assuming the rank of colonel.

=== Expedition of the Thousand ===
With the 6th Farnese Regiment, Francesco Landi was engaged in the repression of the Revolt of the Gancia of early April 1860 which ended on April 14 with the executions of dozens of conspirators. His service during the revolt led to his promotion to brigadier general on April 19 at the age of 68. In this phase of his life, Francesco Landi suffered from an unsteady health and difficulty in staying on horseback for a long time, preferring the carriage in operational movements, which was also the usual means for senior officers.

In Sicily there was no open revolution but there was a revolutionary atmosphere that could get out of hand, due to the various outbreaks of civil unrest. The attitude of the Sicilians was hostile not only because they were dissatisfied with the government, but also because of the intolerance towards the Neapolitan occupation. From the Revolt of the Gancia, there was a succession of actions by armed gangs, which, although not decisive, enjoyed popular support, especially from Cavour's Piedmontese agents and had the effect of keeping in constant pressure and a state of alarm the army, forcing it to long and exhausting marches and displacements to face the various threats.

In April 1860, there were 25,000 soldiers in Sicily, garrisoned mainly at Palermo who reached the various parts of Sicily with mobile columns according to needs. The troops in Sicily were commanded by Lieutenant General Paolo Ruffo, Prince of Castelcicala, in charge of the land and sea forces stationed in Sicily. The army had a territorial order, so the constitution of brigades and divisions took place only when they had to operate, creating heterogeneous and not very close-knit units precisely in moments of operational peak. This order was justified by the conviction that a policy of international isolation would keep the kingdom safe from conflicts, considering the army as a tool to be used mainly to maintain public order.

Although the hypothesis of a landing in Sicily had been aired for some time, the authorities had not prepared a plan until May, limiting themselves to sending mobile columns of troops where armed bands were reported. The passage of mobile columns near the inhabited centers created inconvenience, especially for the supplies found locally on which the mobile columns depended. For lack of coordination between General Paolo Ruffo, head of the Sicilian command, and General Giovanni Salzano de Luna, head of the square of Palermo, the return to Palermo by sea from Trapani of the columns led by General Giuseppe Letizia was ordered, and at the same time the sending of a mobile column from Palermo to deal with the news of new insurgents in Sicily and in particular, a prediction of an imminent landing of Giuseppe Garibaldi, who departed from Quarto on May 5, expected to land, according to information from the Neapolitan command, on the stretch of Sicilian coast between Mazara and San Vito Lo Capo. The War Council decided to give command of the operations to stop Garibaldi to Francesco Landi, preferring him to General Giovan Luca von Mechel as he was of Swiss origin and therefore deemed a foreigner.

Landi's mobile columns left Palermo on May 6, 1860, but the command's concern was not to remove all troops from Palermo, which was itself the potential hotbed of a revolt, and therefore to use as few men and means as possible.

The general would move very cautiously, and lamented the lack of postal services along the way and the presence of broken telegraph poles. In his correspondence with superiors, Landi complained about the absence of telegraphic communications and the lack of a fast relay service that would allow the rapid exchange of messages with the commands of Palermo, less than 80 km from Calatafimi, so he would have to rely on pedestrians for communication.

On May 9, Landi was at Alcamo where he remained until May 12, when he would receive communication from Palermo of Garibaldi's landing in Marsala, receiving the order to meet him, with the promise that reinforcements would join him in Calatafimi.

Landi arrived at Calatafimi at dawn on May 13. In correspondence with the superior commands, Landi would report the presence of a growing mass of insurgents who had their headquarters in Salemi. Landi, out of prudence, decided not to head towards Salemi to face the insurgents, considering it more favorable to wait for the impact of the insurgents in Calatafimi in order to cut the road to Palermo. Landi had a total of about 3,000 soldiers in mobile columns, while he didn't know the size of the enemy expedition, nor did he have precise information on their movements. Landi then asked Palermo for further troops who could seize the enemy from behind however these troops wouldn't arrive. On May 14 from Palermo, Landi would receive a communication to fall back to Partinico, in contradiction with the previous orders to deal with the expedition. A perplexed Landi sent a patrol expedition on May 15 to identify the enemy troops, preferring this solution to the continuation of the initial attack plan or the retreat towards Partinico. The patrol columns were composed of several companies, including those of the 8th Hunters battalion under the command of Major Sforza, who would meet the Garibaldians and, after an initial phase of observation, would autonomously decide to attack around 10:00 in the morning, and this led to the Battle of Calatafimi.

The confrontation would last around eight hours and would end with the retreat ordered by Landi, after an unexpected resistance by Garibaldi and his men.

Landi was heavily criticized of his conduct during the Battle of Calatafimi in which excessive prudence, the lack of coordination of the first attack, and an early retreat would determine an important impact on the morale of the troops, generating a chain of events that would lead to the fall of Palermo and an incredible military defeat. Part of the responsibilities, according to de Cesare in his account, were attributed to the contradictory orders of the various commands, afflicted by internal rivalries, to the delay in the arrival of reinforcements from Naples, to the untimely change of the lieutenant general on the same day of the Battle of Calatafimi. Rivalry between Paolo Ruffo, Prince of Castelcicala with the lieutenant general Ferdinando Lanza, seventy-two years old at the time, and the well-founded fear of the presence in the surroundings of Calatafimi of insurgent formations that could support Garibaldi and seize Landi from behind.

During the orderly retreat towards Palermo, Landi wasambushed by armed gangs that forced him to a limited defense due to the scarcity of the remaining ammunition. Back in Palermo, General Lanza complained of Landi's excessive haste in retiring. The defense of Landi was based on the contradictory orders received from the command, which in the meantime passed from General Paolo Ruffo to General Ferdinando Lanza, and on the description given of the events. These explanations were considered exhaustive by Lanza, as the latter confirmed Landi in command and uses him in positions of responsibility until the Siege of Palermo which started on May 27 with the arrival of Garibaldi at the gates of the city.

=== Accusations of Treason ===
Landi, together with the other generals who had participated in the Sicilian defeat, would be subjected to a commission of inquiry, which would however conclude with a favorable judgment, attributing the failure to exceptional events not attributable to the conduct of the generals. After this judgment, Landi left the army and died a few months later in Naples, following a pleurisy, on February 2, 1861.

To mitigate the sins of the regime, the Bourbon thesis was that the fall was due to the betrayal of the leaders, ancient Murattists, ungrateful for having been readmitted after the initial expulsion. Lieutenant General Paolo Ruffo, Prince of Castelcicala, after his removal as lieutenant for Sicily on the day of the Battle of Calatafimi, would accuse Landi of treason, regarding the excessively long time taken by the latter in the movements of his troops. Ruffo's accusations will also involve other officers, including General Lanza. A commission of inquiry had already addressed the issue, exonerating all generals, including Landi.

Added to this, in 1861 the rumour was spread, without evidence, that Francesco Landi, now on leave, went to the Banco di Napoli, to collect a credit policy of 14,000 gold ducats as a reward received by Giuseppe Garibaldi in order not to oppose his advance, then proved, according to rumors, a falsified faith worth only 14 ducats, hence the alleged sudden death from a stroke.

Raffaele de Cesare also specified that Landi died after a few days of illness and not suddenly as the Bourbon writers said.

On the event, one of the general's sons managed to obtain a letter of denial from Garibaldi himself.

De Cesare believes that Landi's retreat to Calatafimi, while decisive, was only the first of a disastrous series of debacles. Landi was not the only one to be, in retrospect, accused of treason, as a long series of other generals were accused of alleged treason both in Sicily and on the continent.

He attributed the defeat to the serious systemic errors committed by the Bourbon army, the absence of a single command, internal rivalries and the tendency to avoid responsibility on the part of the highest officers:

Certainly it was a serious mistake to have given Landi the command of greater responsibility, since it was possible to foresee that his column would have more likely faced Garibaldi's first impact; more serious mistake of having given it to him in the reported conditions; and the greatest mistake in recalling Letizia from Trapani, just as it was an inexcusable and inexplicable fault for not having made the requested battalions arrive in Marsala after the landing of the Thousand. Only one government was needed, and there were two: in Naples and Palermo; only one man was needed to command, and there were many, suspicious and jealous of each other; generals full of faith and eager to fight were needed, and a loved and feared King, while Francis II was neither that nor this; and of the generals, each sought shelter from the storm as best he could, dodging all responsibility, so no one was really convinced that that state of affairs was worth defending, with the sacrifice of their life, or their reputation!
