= Rimini Proclamation =

1815 proclamation by Joachim Murat, King of Naples

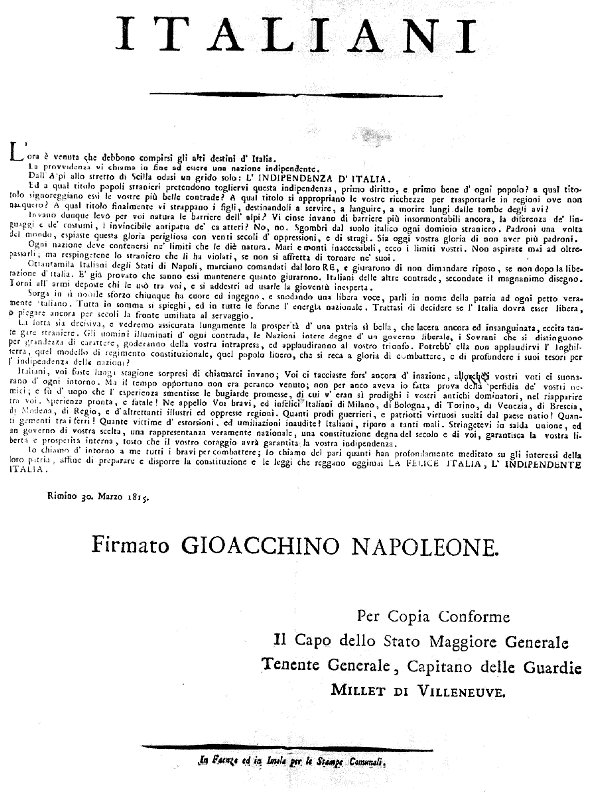
Copy of the Rimini Proclamation, held in Turin's Museum of the Risorgimento

The Rimini Proclamation (Italian: Proclama di Rimini) was a proclamation by Joachim Murat, King of Naples, calling for the establishment of a united, self-governing Italy ruled by constitutional law. Its text is widely attributed to Pellegrino Rossi, later Papal Minister of Interior under Pope Pius IX. While it is primarily considered as a desperate attempt from Murat to retain the Neapolitan throne, the Rimini Proclamation was among the earliest calls for Italian unification.

The Rimini Proclamation is dated to 30 March 1815, when Murat's army was passing through Rimini in the Neapolitan War against the Austrian Empire, though it may have been published only after Murat's defeat at the Battle of Tolentino in May 1815. The citizens' address begins with the call:

Italians! The hour has come to engage in your highest destinies.

== Background ==
The Kingdom of Naples, which ruled the southern half of the Italian peninsula, was a client state of Napoleon Bonaparte's French Empire. In 1808, Napoleon named Joachim Murat as King of Naples; Murat had married Caroline Bonaparte, Napoleon's younger sister, in 1800. The northern half of the Italian peninsula was divided by the French Empire and, from 17 March 1805, the Kingdom of Italy, another French client state, with Napoleon as King of Italy.

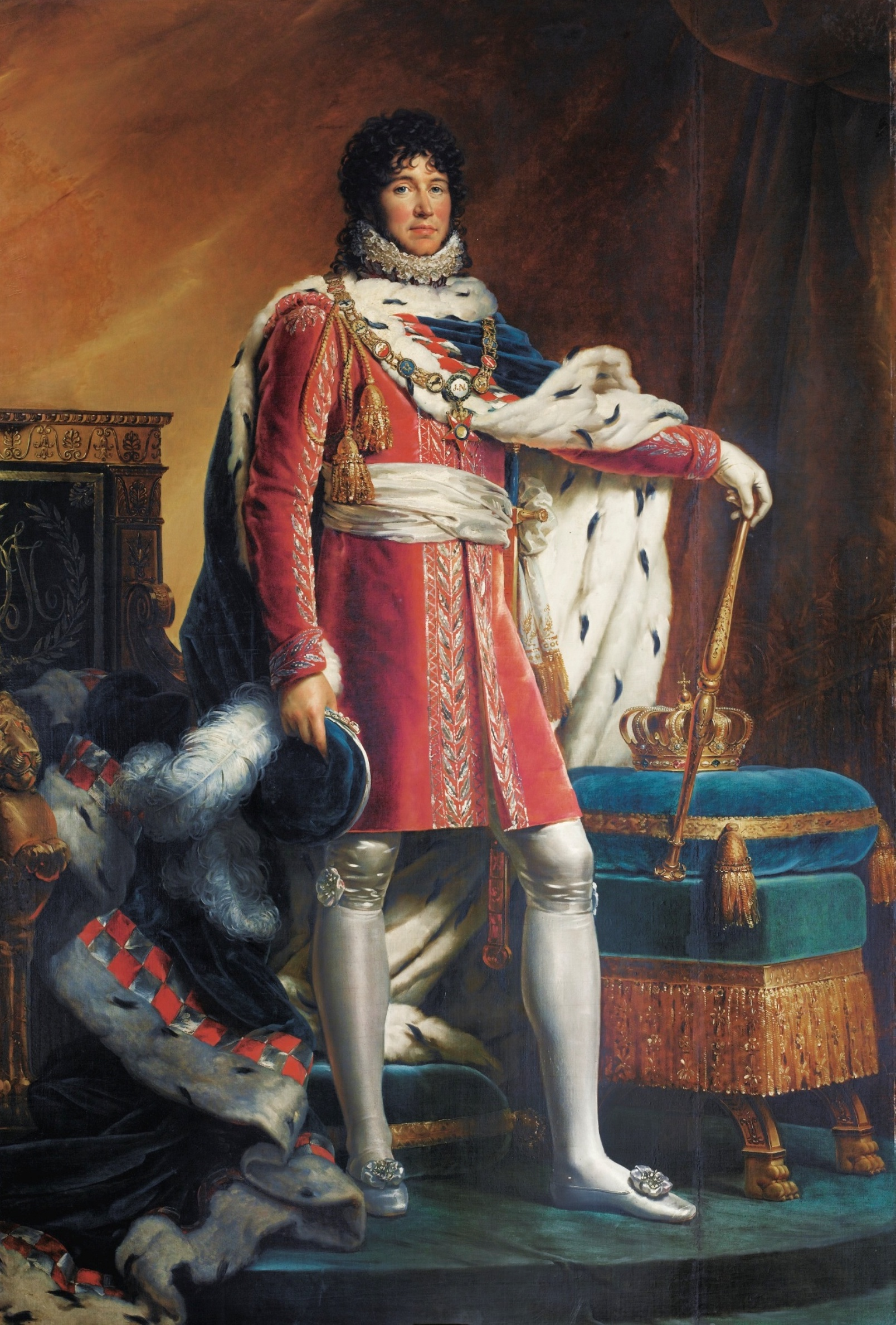
Portrait of Joachim Murat as King of Naples by François Gérard, c. 1812

By January 1814, Napoleon was losing the War of the Sixth Coalition, in which a coalition of European states fought against the French Empire and its client states. On 11 January 1814, the Kingdom of Naples and the Austrian Empire signed the Treaty of Naples, under which Murat defected to the coalition. As part of the treaty, Murat would keep the Neapolitan throne in return for sending 30,000 troops against the Kingdom of Italy. Murat's troops passed through the city of Rimini, at the southern tip of the Kingdom of Italy, on 1 February 1814.

Following further military defeats, Napoleon abdicated on 6 April 1814. At the Congress of Vienna, Klemens von Metternich, Austria's Foreign Minister, was bound by other coalition allies that wanted to restore Ferdinand IV of the House of Bourbon to the Neapolitan throne, particularly Britain.

With his throne no longer secure, following Napoleon's return from exile, Murat switched sides in an unsuccessful attempt to return to Napoleon's favour. On 15 March 1815, the Kingdom of Naples declared war on the Austrian Empire, starting the Neapolitan War. With an estimated 45,000 troops, the Neapolitan army invaded the Papal States, Tuscany, and the Marche. Though the Austrian army in northern Italy numbered 94,000 troops, it was widely distributed. On 30 March 1815, Murat's troops arrived in Rimini, where they were hosted by the Battaglini counts. In a final attempt to gain allies, Murat published the Rimini Proclamation.

== Contents ==
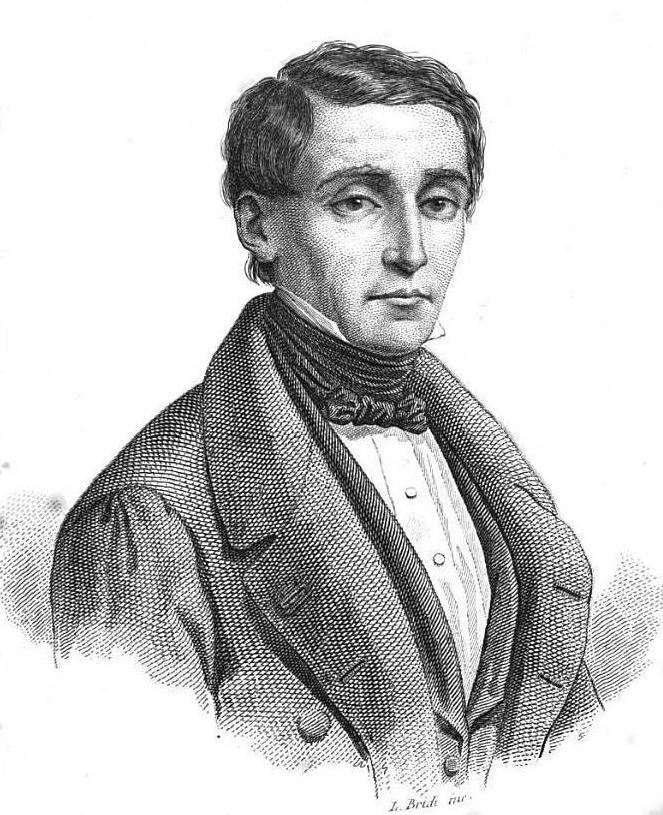
Drawing of Pellegrino Rossi by Luigi Bridi, 1859

The Rimini Proclamation consists of two documents: one addressed to soldiers and one addressed to citizens. The proclamation is often identified as the latter address to citizens. Most scholars attribute the text of the addresses to Pellegrino Rossi, later Papal Minister of the Interior under Pope Pius IX.

The citizens' address begins with the call:

Italians! The hour has come to engage in your highest destinies. Providence ultimately calls you to be an independent nation. From the Alps to the Strait of Scylla, you hear a single cry: "The independence of Italy!" And under what title do foreign peoples claim to take away this independence, the first right and first good of every people?

The proclamation references Italy's physical geography – "the barriers of the Alps" and "inaccessible seas and mountains" – as evidence of Italy's call to independence. It compares Italy's subjection to "England, that model of constitutional rule, that free people, who goes to glory to fight". It calls on the "good and unhappy Italians of Milan, Bologna, Turin, Venice, Brescia, Modena, [and] Reggio" to "come together in firm union" for "a Constitution worthy of the century and of you".

In its desire for independence and constitutionalism, the proclamation was written to inspire liberal elites in northern Italy.

== Aftermath ==
400 volunteers joined Murat's army on 30 March 1815. Murat's eastern column advanced northwards from Rimini towards the River Po, entering Bologna on 2 April, while the western column reached Florence on 8 April. On the same day, the eastern column engaged 3,000 Austrian soldiers at the Battle of Occhiobello. Following its defeat at Occhiobello, it was pushed southwards, leading to Murat's decisive defeat at the Battle of Tolentino on 2–3 May. Murat returned to Naples on 18 May, where Caroline had already surrendered to the British, and fled immediately to southern France.

Hearing of Napoleon's defeat at the Battle of Waterloo on 18 June 1815, Murat fled to Corsica, from which he attempted an impossible invasion of Calabria. Napoleon remarked: "Murat attempted to reconquer with 200 men that territory which he failed to hold when he had 80,000 at his disposal." Murat was captured, sentenced to death, and shot by firing squad in Pizzo Calabro on 13 October 1815.

In Il re lazzarone (1999), Risorgimento scholar Giuseppe Campolieti hypothesises that the Rimini Proclamation was only published on 12 May 1815, after Murat's defeat at Tolentino, and backdated to 30 March.

== Legacy ==
The Rimini Proclamation is primarily considered a desperate attempt from Murat to retain the Neapolitan throne. Nevertheless, and somewhat ironically for a French king, it was among the earliest calls for Italian unification and independence. The proclamation impressed poet Alessandro Manzoni, who wrote a song entitled Il proclama di Rimini, but he left it unfinished after Murat's campaign failed.

== See also ==
- (in Italian) Text of the proclamation on Italian Wikisource
