= Treaty of Naples (1814) =

The Treaty of Naples of 11 January 1814 was a treaty that was signed between the Kingdom of Naples and the Austrian Empire.

After the disastrous Battle of Leipzig, Napoleon was losing the war, so the Neapolitan king Joachim Murat decided to defect to the Coalition to avoid defeat. Murat promised to send 30,000 troops to the help the Austrians against the Kingdom of Italy, in exchange for keeping the Neapolitan throne.

However, the main Coalition members during the Congress of Vienna wanted Ferdinand IV of Naples and Sicily back, so Murat, hearing the news that Napoleon returned to France, declared war on Austria, starting the Neapolitan War. The war ended with the disastrous Battle of Tolentino and an Austrian victory. The two sides signed the Treaty of Casalanza and Murat was executed.
