= Battle of Pesaro =

1815 battle during the Neapolitan War

- Part of the Neapolitan War
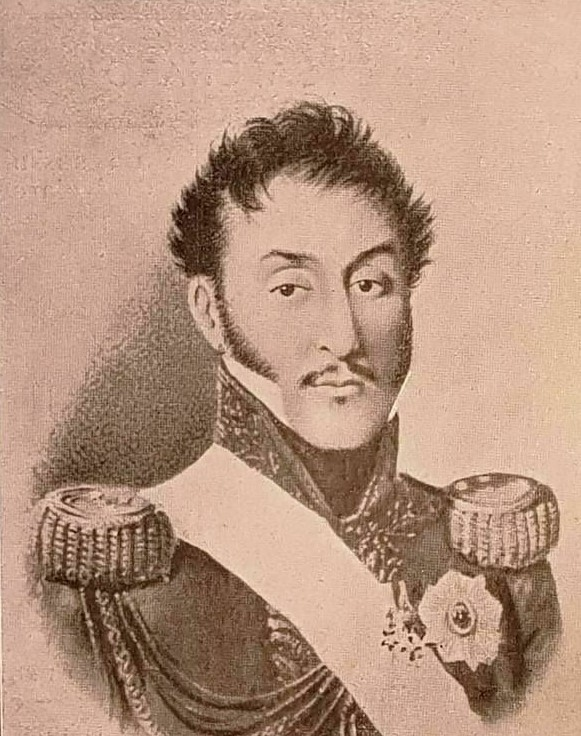
- Michele Carrascosa
Date	28 April 1815; 211 years ago
Location	Pesaro, present-day Italy 43°54′41.73″N 12°54′35.17″E
Result	Austrian victory

Belligerents
Austrian Empire	Kingdom of Naples

Commanders and leaders
(Austrian Empire) General Major Geppert	Michele Carrascosa

Strength
400	3,000

Casualties and losses
25 killed or wounded	200 killed or wounded 250 captured
- Location within Europe

The Battle of Pesaro was a minor battle in the Neapolitan War that took place on 28 April 1815 in the town of Pesaro.

The main Neapolitan army, commanded by their king, Joachim Murat, was retreating to their original headquarters in Ancona following a string a defeats in Northern Italy at the hands of the Germans. The Neapolitans were being pursued by an Austrian corps under the command of Adam Albert von Neipperg. Just like at the Battle of Cesenatico, a vastly outnumbered Austrian raiding party of hussars and jägers once again successfully attacked a Neapolitan garrison of 3,000 men during the night. The Austrians brought out 250 prisoners with only minor casualties whilst inflicting moderate casualties on the garrison, forcing them to flee during the night.

== Citations ==
Preceded by Battle of Cesenatico	Napoleonic Wars; Battle of Pesaro	Succeeded by Battle of Scapezzano
