= Battle of San Germano =

1815 battle during the Neapolitan War

- Part of the Neapolitan War
Date	15 May – 17 May 1815
Location	Cassino, present-day Italy 41°30′00″N 13°50′00″E
Result	Austrian victory

Belligerents
Austrian Empire	Kingdom of Naples

Commanders and leaders
(Austrian Empire) Laval Nugent von Westmeath	(Kingdom of Naples) Joachim Murat

Strength
8,000	15,000

Casualties and losses
500 killed or wounded	3,500 killed or wounded 1,000+ captured
- Location within Europe

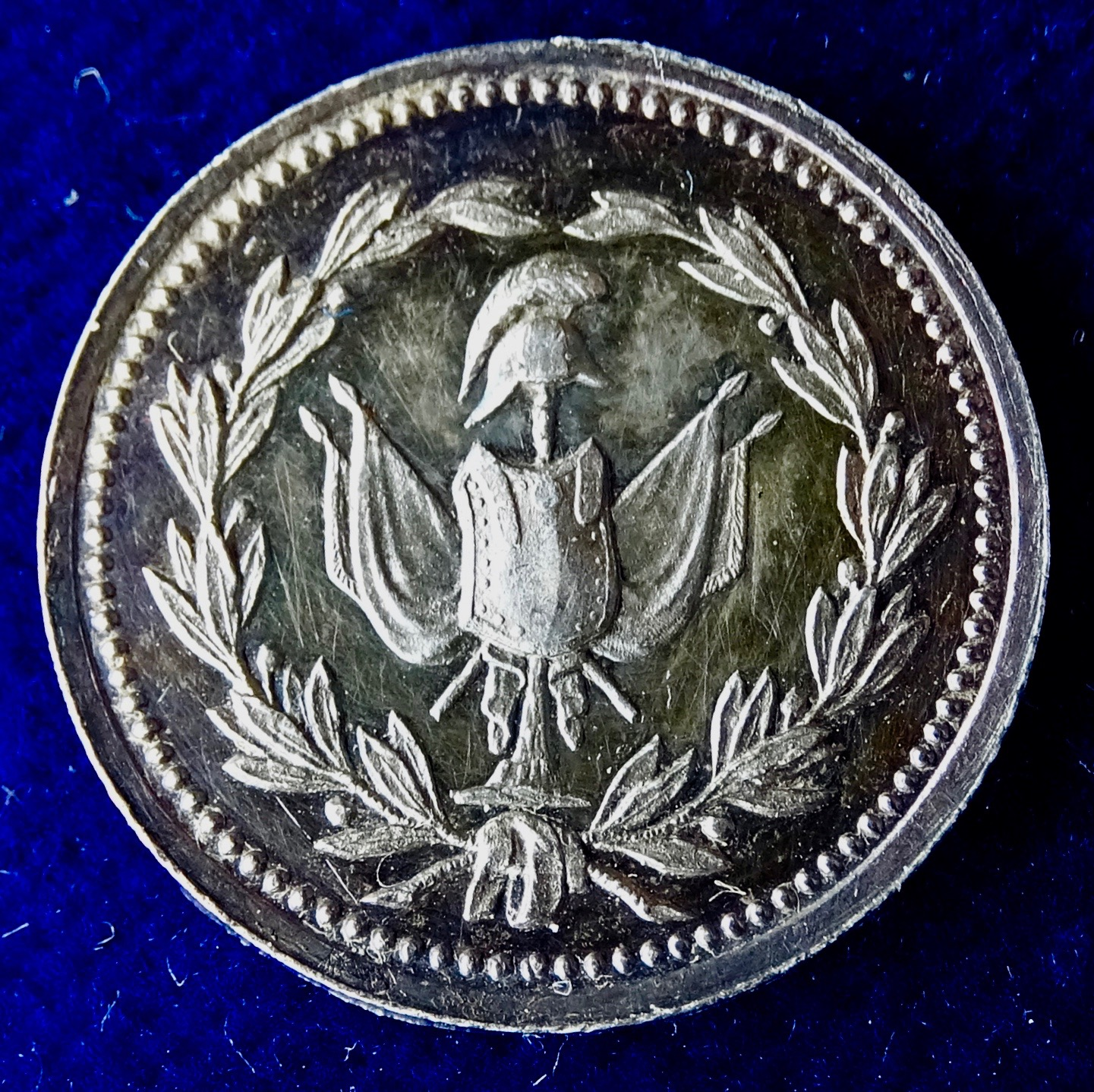
1815 Austrian Silver Medal Battle of San Germano, obverse

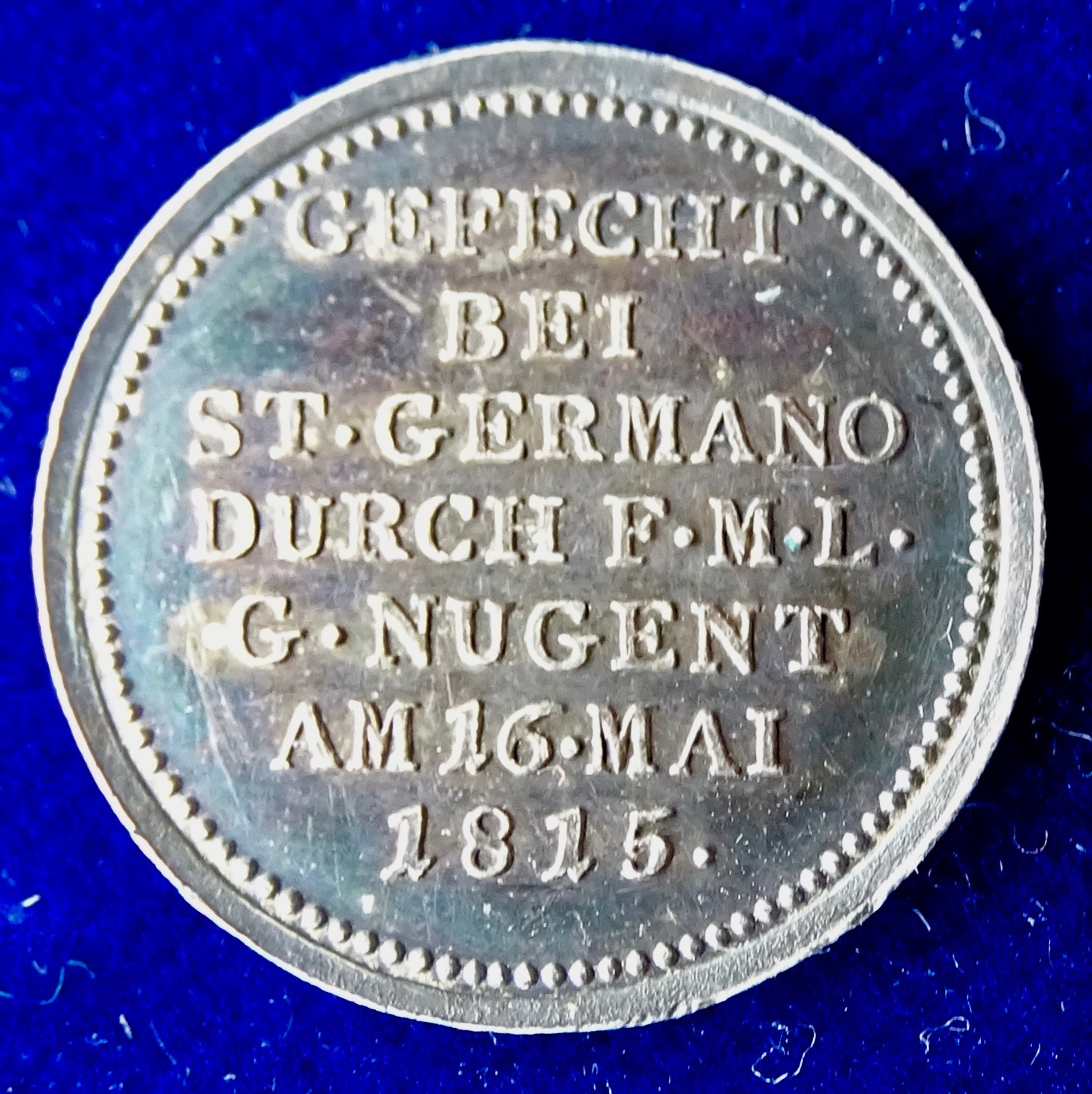
Silver Medal Battle of San Germano, 16 May 1815 by Austrian Field Marshal Nugent, reverse

The Battle of San Germano (or the Battle of Mignano) was the final battle in the Neapolitan War between an Austrian force commanded by Laval Nugent von Westmeath and the King of Naples, Joachim Murat. The battle started on 15 May 1815 and ended on 17 May, after the remaining Neapolitan force was routed at Mignano.

Following his defeat at the Battle of Tolentino, Murat had fallen back to San Germano, now Cassino. There Murat reinforced his battered army with the Army of the Interior, which had been left in reserve to defend Naples during the war. Even so, most of the original Neapolitan force had been killed, wounded or deserted, and Murat's force only totalled 15,000. Meanwhile, General Nugent's force, who had marched from Florence, arrived in Rome on 30 April. From there, he marched towards Ceprano, where there was a minor engagement with a band of local militia. After receiving word of Murat's defeat at Tolentino, Nugent moved to intercept his retreat back to Naples.

By 14 May, the Austrians were moving on Murat's position in San Germano. The following day, Murat decided to counterattack and drove back Nugent's vanguard, before attacking the entire Austrian line. However, another Austrian force of 25,000 men under the command of Frederick Bianchi, which had followed Murat from Tolentino, were now moving to surround the Neapolitan position. With the attack faltering, and the Neapolitans beginning to sustain substantial casualties, Murat pulled back to San Germano and formed a defensive position. But as soon as Nugent's force approached, the Neapolitans panicked and retreated. Murat fell back to Capua with a small portion of the army, whilst the bulk of the army regrouped and took up a position around Mignano.

It was here that a force of about 1,000 hussars supported by jägers and Grenzers assaulted and routed the remaining 6,000 Neapolitans. The majority of the Neapolitans fled as soon as the battle started, with the Austrians eventually taking over 1,000 prisoners. With the entire Army of the Interior now in disarray, Murat chose to flee Italy altogether on 19 May and the Neapolitans sued for peace, resulting in the Treaty of Casalanza.

Preceded by Battle of Castel di Sangro	Napoleonic Wars; Battle of San Germano	Succeeded by Siege of Gaeta (1815)
