= Treaty of Casalanza =

1815 treaty between Naples and Austria

The Treaty of Casalanza, which ended the Neapolitan War, was signed on 20 May 1815 between the Napoleonic Kingdom of Naples on the one hand and the Austrian Empire, as well as Great Britain, on the other. The signature occurred in a patrician villa, owned by the Lanza family ("Casalanza" meaning "Lanza House" in Italian), in what is now the commune of Pastorano, Campania, southern Italy.

Following the decisive defeat at the Battle of Tolentino and the Battle of San Germano, the Napoleonic King of Naples, Joachim Murat, had fled to Corsica and General Michele Carascosa, who was now the head of the Neapolitan army following Murat's flight, sued for peace. The treaty was signed by Pietro Colletta (who was acting as plenipotentiary to Michele Carascosa), Adam Albert von Neipperg (who was acting as plenipotentiary to the commander-in-chief of the Austrian forces, Frederick Bianchi), and Lord Burghersh (the English minister plenipotentiary in Florence).

The terms of the treaty were quite lenient on the defeated Neapolitans. All the Neapolitan generals were allowed to keep their rank and the borders of the Kingdom of Naples remained unchanged. The treaty merely called for the return of the pre-Napoleonic King Ferdinand IV of Naples and Sicily to the Neapolitan throne, the return of all prisoners of war and for all the Neapolitan garrisons to lay down their arms, with the exception of Ancona, Pescara and Gaeta. These three cities were all being blockaded by an Anglo-Austrian fleet and were out of General Carascosa's control. These three garrisons eventually surrendered, although the siege of Gaeta would last till August, long after Napoleon's defeat at the Battle of Waterloo.

== Sources ==
- Colletta, Pietro (1834). Storia del Reame di Napoli dal 1734 al 1825. Naples.
