= Siege of Gaeta (1815) =

1815 siege during the Neapolitan War

- Part of the Neapolitan War
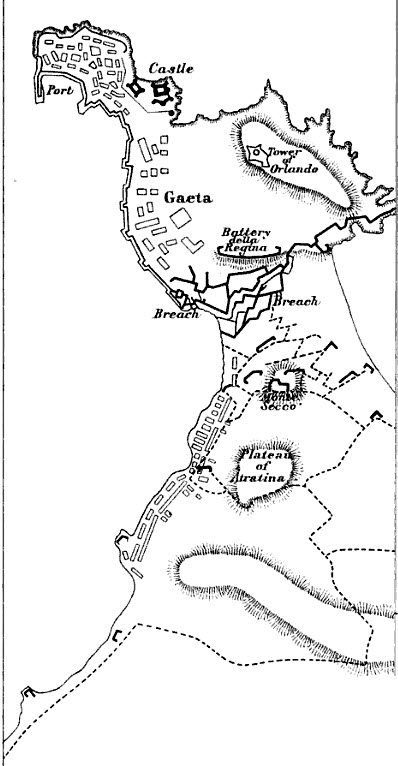
- Map of the 1806 siege of Gaeta showing the terrain
| Date | 28 May – 8 August 1815 |
| Location | Gaeta, present-day Italy 41.2167°N 13.5667°E |
| Result | Coalition victory |

Belligerents
| Austrian Empire; United Kingdom; Kingdom of Sicily | Kingdom of Naples |

Commanders and leaders
| Joseph Freiherr von Lauer | Maresciallo di Campo Alessandro Begani |

Strength
| 2,500 | 2,000 |

Casualties and losses
| 277 killed or wounded | 238 killed 1,762 captured |
- Location within Europe

The siege of Gaeta of 1815 was a three-month siege of the city of Gaeta by Austrian forces during the Neapolitan War.

== Siege ==
The Neapolitan garrison was commanded by Maresciallo di Campo Alessandro Begani, general of the deposed King of Naples Gioacchino Murat, while the Austrians were commanded by Joseph Freiherr von Lauer. The Austrians were reinforced by the ships of the Royal Navy. On 8 August 1815 the city capitulated, marking the official end of the war.

== Aftermath ==
The defenders were forced to capitulate due to the lack of food and for the diseases that raged in the troops. For the surrender, General Begani obtained honorable conditions.

== Notes ==
| Preceded by Battle of San Germano | Napoleonic Wars; Siege of Gaeta (1815) | Succeeded by Battle of Quatre Bras |
