= Battle of Calatafimi =

Battle during the unification of Italy

- Part of the Expedition of the Thousand
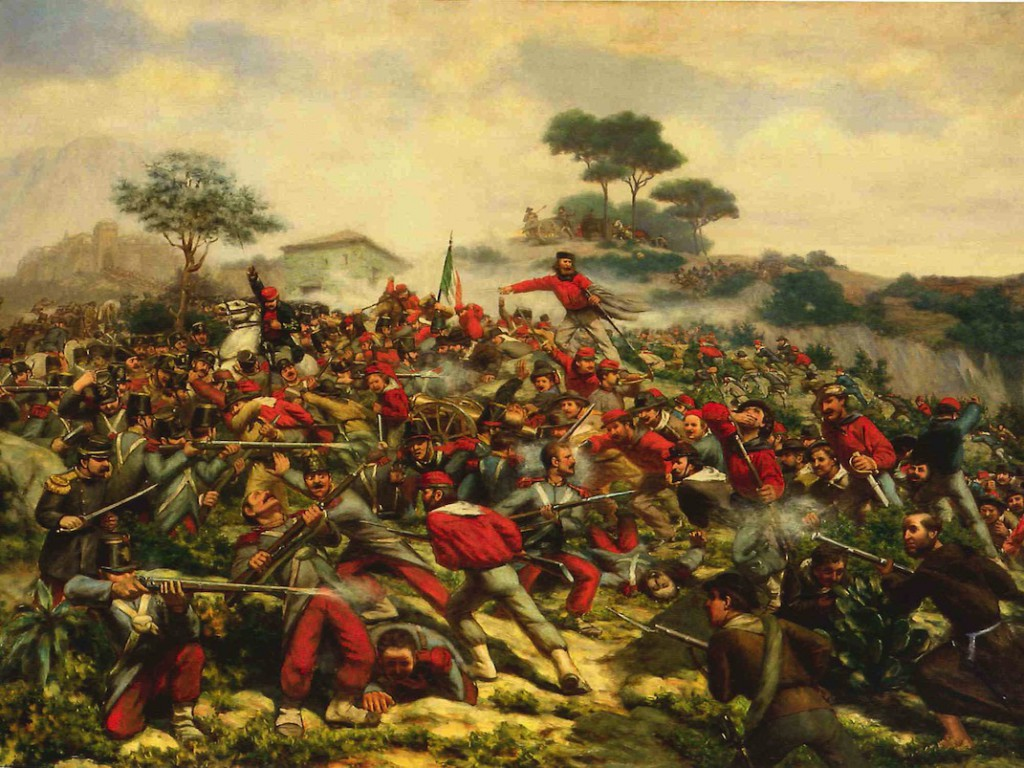
- Skirmish at Calatafimi
Date	15 May 1860
Location	Calatafimi, Sicily
Result	Garibaldine victory: Two Sicilies forces retreat; Garibaldi takes Calatafimi

Belligerents
(Italy) Red Shirts	(Kingdom of the Two Sicilies) Two Sicilies

Commanders and leaders
Giuseppe Garibaldi	Francesco Landi

Strength
1,200	2,000

Casualties and losses
32 killed 160–182 wounded	36 killed 148 wounded 6 captured 1 gun captured

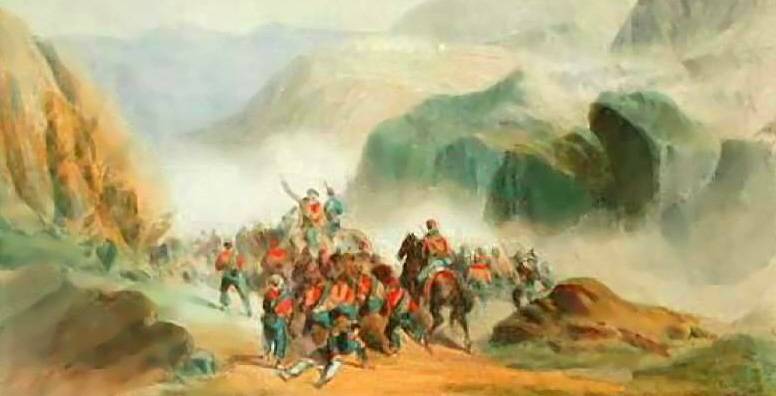
Garibaldi's – Red Shirts at Calatafimi

The Battle of Calatafimi was fought on 15 May 1860 between Giuseppe Garibaldi's Redshirts and the troops of the Kingdom of the Two Sicilies at Calatafimi, Sicily, as part of the Expedition of the Thousand (Italian: I Mille). The battle was Garibaldi's first victory during his invasion of Sicily in 1860 and saw his 'Thousand' defeat a larger Neapolitan army sent from Palermo to block the roads to the Sicilian capital.

== Prelude ==
Four days before the battle, the Mille had landed at Marsala, on board the ships Il Piemonte and Il Lombardo. Francesco Crispi, among others, landed before the Mille on Sicily to raise support among the locals for the Mille.

Garibaldi took the direct route to Palermo via Salemi. Paolo Ruffo di Castelcicala, commanding Palermo, sent Landi west, and Mechel south, in an attempt to intercept Garibaldi. Landi deployed his 2,700 men on the terraced hill Piante dei Romani, consisting of three battalions, with a squadron of light horse and four cannon. Garibaldi had 2,000 men that included the squadre recruited by Giuseppe La Mesa and Rosalino Pilo. Garibaldi would have to attack uphill.

Alexander Dumas and Giustiniano Lebano played a key role in supplying Garibaldi with ammunition for the battle

== Battle ==
The battle started at 1:30 pm and was over in three hours after Landi's men ran out of ammunition and retreated.

The battle was inconclusive, but served to boost the morale of the Mille and, at the same time, depress the Neapolitans, who, ill led with their often corrupted officers, started to feel themselves abandoned. During the battle, Garibaldi is said to have uttered the famous battle cry "Qui si fa l'Italia o si muore" ("Here we make Italy, or we die").

== Aftermath ==
On 17 May, following the battle's success, Garibaldi continued his advance on Palermo.

With the help of a popular insurrection, on 27 May Garibaldi began the Siege of Palermo, the island's capital. The city was defended by some 18,000 men, but they were under the confused and timid command of general Ferdinando Lanza, aged 72, and on 30 May Garibaldi's forces took Palermo.

== See also ==
- Risorgimento
- Expedition of the Thousand
- Giuseppe Garibaldi

Media related to Battle of Calatafimi at Wikimedia Commons
