= Laval Nugent von Westmeath =

Irish-born army officer

Count Laval Nugent von Westmeath
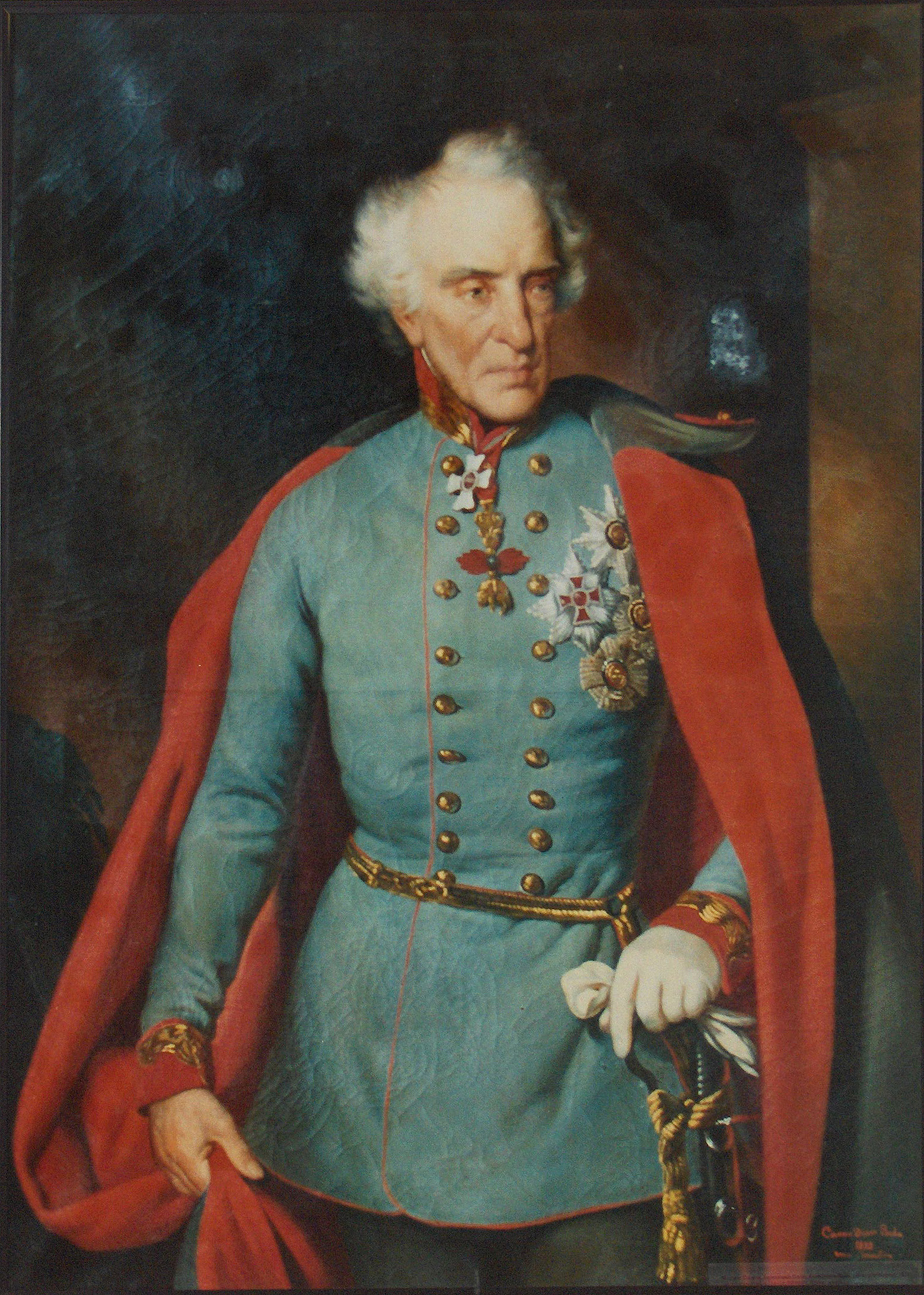
- Laval Graf Nugent von Westmeath
- Born: 7 November 1777; Ballynacor, County Westmeath, Ireland
- Died: 21 August 1862 (aged 84); Karlovac, Austrian Empire
- Military career
- Allegiance: Austrian Empire; Kingdom of the Two Sicilies
- Service years: 1793–1862
- Rank: Field Marshal
- Wars: Napoleonic Wars: Illyrian Campaign of 1813; Battle of Lippa; Neapolitan War; Battle of the Taro; Battle of San Germano; Carbonari Rebellion; First Italian War of Independence; Hungarian Revolution of 1848

Laval Graf Nugent von Westmeath (3 November 1777 – 21 August 1862) was an Irish-born army officer who served in the armies of Austria and the Two Sicilies.

== Biography ==
Born at Ballinacor House, Clonboy, Co. Westmeath, Ireland, Nugent was the son of Count Michael Anton Nugent von Westmeath, Governor of Prague.

Following the early demise of his father, at the age of 12 he was sent to Vienna, where his uncle's patronage secured him a place as a cadet at the Military Engineering Academy. In 1793, he joined the Austrian Army, becoming Colonel in 1807, and Chief of Staff of the Army Corps of Archduke Johann of Austria in 1809. After his time on the staff, he was briefly employed as a diplomat in Great Britain. Nugent was promoted to Major General on 24 May 1813. In 1813, during the Italian campaign of 1813–1814, he led the campaign against Viceroy Eugène de Beauharnais, separating French units in Dalmatia and simultaneously joining the British fleet, thus conquering Croatia, Istria and the Po Valley. In 1815, during the Neapolitan War, he commanded the right wing of the Austrian Army in Italy, liberated Rome, and defeated Joachim Murat at the Battle of Ceprano and the Battle of San Germano.

In 1816, Nugent was given the title of prince by Pope Pius VII. In 1817, he entered the service of King Ferdinand I of the Two Sicilies. He married Countess Giovannina Riario-Sforza who owned property in the small town of Montepeloso (Irsina), in Basilicata. After the outbreak of the Carbonari rebellion in 1820, he returned to serve in the Austrian Army. In 1848, he led an Army Corps under Joseph Radetzky von Radetz against the Piedmontese, in the course of the First Italian War of Independence, and also against the Hungarian Revolution of 1848. He received the title of Field Marshal in 1849.

In recognition of his achievements, he was created in addition to a Roman Prince (above), an Austrian Imperial Count and a Knight of the Golden Fleece. Later, in 1860, he was appointed titular Prior of Ireland of the Sovereign Military Order of St. John of Jerusalem of Rhodes of Malta.

Nugent died on 22 August 1862 in the Bosiljevo Castle, near Karlovac, and his body was later transferred to a sarcophagus in the Doric temple "Peace for the Hero", in Trsat above Rijeka, next to the sarcophagus of his wife.

An exhibition of his life in terms of his art collecting as well as his military career was curated at the University of Galway in 2019.

== See also ==
- Earl of Westmeath
- Irish military diaspora
- Irish regiments

== Sources ==
- Laval, Graf Nugent von Westmeath. In Meyers Konversations-Lexikon. 5. Auflage, 1896.
- Nugent, Laval Graf von. In ADB. Band 24. Duncker & Humblodt, Leipzig 1875-1912. Online:
- Nugent-Westmeath, Laval Graf. In Constantin von Wurzbach, Biographisches Lexikon des Kaiserthums Oesterreich. 20. Band. Wien 1869. Online:
