= Siege of Ancona =

1815 siege during the Neapolitan War

- Part of the Neapolitan War
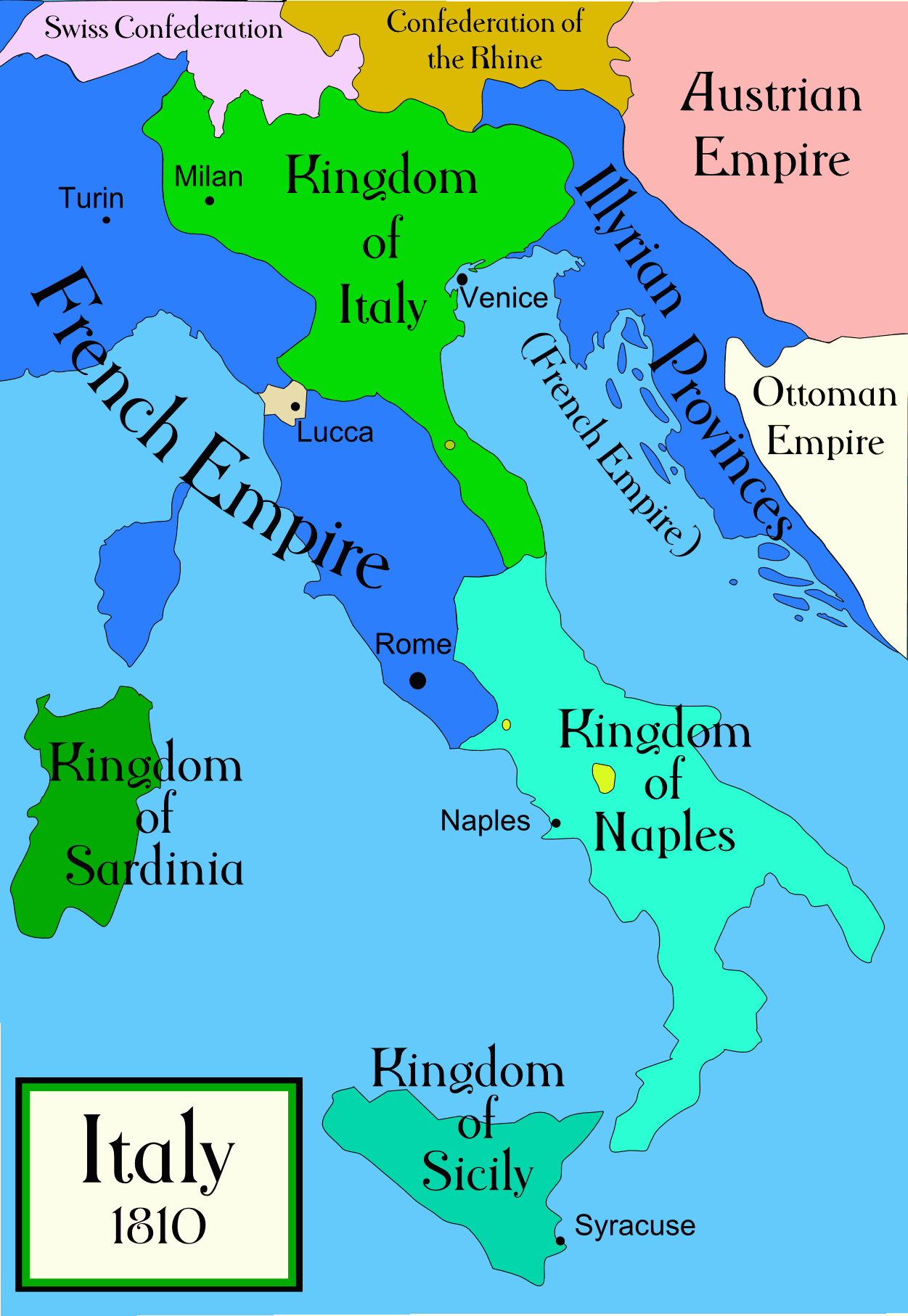
- Political map of Italy in the years around 1810
Date	5–30 May 1815
Location	Ancona, present-day Italy 43°36′56.99″N 13°31′8.09″E
Result	Coalition victory

Belligerents
Austrian Empire; United Kingdom; Kingdom of Sicily	Kingdom of Naples

Commanders and leaders
Menrad Freiherr von Geppert	Baron Monte Majo

Strength
2,300	1,500

Casualties and losses
Light	500 killed or wounded 1,000 captured
- Location within Europe

The siege of Ancona took place during the Neapolitan War. It took place beginning on 5 May 1815 and persisted until 30 May 1815. The battle took place mere days after the Battle of Tolentino on 3 May 1815.

The siege of Ancona was one of the last conflicts in Italy during the Neapolitan War. The city of Ancona was the last major Italian city to surrender. It was fought between Napoleon's forces in Ancona, Italy and the Anglo-Austrian alliance during the One Hundred Days’ campaign. The Anglo-Austrian alliance eventually defeated Napoleon's forces, thus helping expel the French from Eastern Italy. It also contributed to the elimination of the Bonaparte monarchy proposed by Murat and led to the establishment of the Papal state.

== Battle ==
An Austrian force commanded by Austrian Major General Menrad Freiherr von Geppert besieged Ancona on 5 May 1815. The Anglo-Austrian force was 2,300 men strong. Ancona was defended by a garrison of Napoleon's troops, which was composed of 1,500 men. This garrison had been part of Michele Carrascosa's brigade, which fought in the Battle of Tolentino. The French lost 500 men to the Anglo-Austrian bombardment before they ultimately surrendered on 30 May.

== Ramifications ==
The siege of Ancona cemented the loss of Napoleon's forces in Italy. Ancona was the last major Italian city to surrender to the Austrians, and the battle came shortly before the downfall of Napoleon at the Battle of Waterloo.

As a result of the expulsion of the French, there arose a power vacuum in Italy. The Italians adamantly refused to support anyone who came in the name of Napoleon. Unification of Italy was Murat's ideal. Murat was an Italian prince who supported Napoleon's bid for power in Italy. As a result of anti-Napoleon sentiment, Murat's attempt to install a Bonaparte monarchy even after the defeat of Napoleon failed to gain traction. His attempt to establish a monarchy in Italy was rejected, and the Bonaparte royalty was completely deposed by the English in Naples at the same time as the end of the siege of Ancona; 30 May 1815. Murat had earlier been defeated in battle by the Austrians on 3 May 1815 at Tolentino. Unfortunately, this meant that the constitution he proposed before his defeat never took hold. However, his ideals of an independent Italy played a role in the Risorgimento, decades later.

The elimination of the Bourbon influence in Italy after the siege of Ancona paved the way for the Papal state that took power in 1814. The Papal state supported a policy of conservatism in Italy, upholding Austrian influence and opposing revolution and unification. Due to this conservative policy, the Papal state hindered the unification of Italy for many years. The administration of the Papal state was in place until the overthrow of Metternich in 1848.

== Citations ==
Preceded by Battle of Tolentino	Napoleonic Wars; Siege of Ancona	Succeeded by Battle of Castel di Sangro
