= Adam Albert von Neipperg =

Austrian marshall and nobleman (1775–1829)

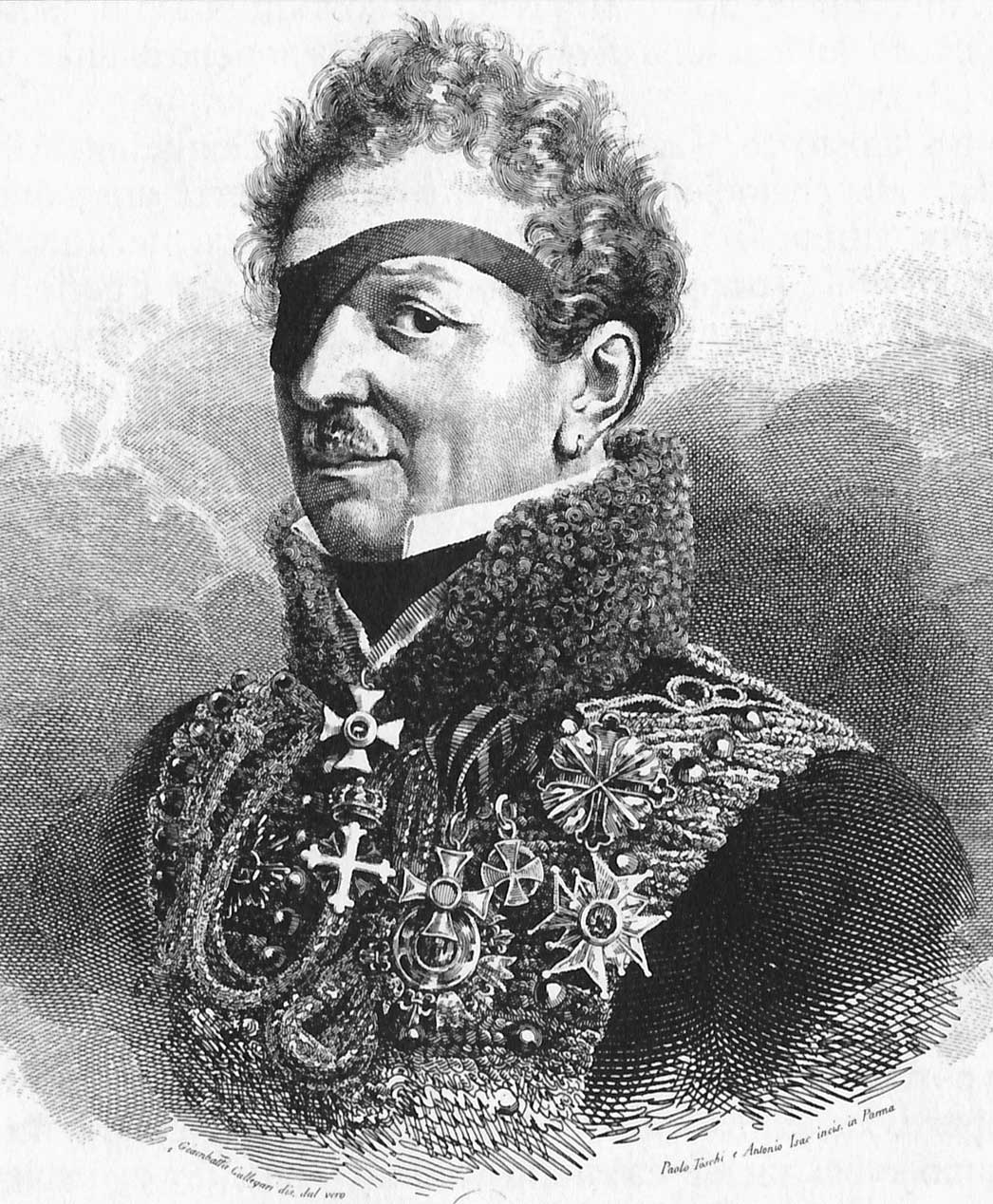
- Adam Albert, Count von Neipperg
- Born: 8 April 1775; Vienna, Archduchy of Austria
- Died: 22 February 1829 (aged 53); Parma, Duchy of Parma
- Military career
- Allegiance: Austrian Empire
- Branch: Cavalry
- Service years: 1791–1829
- Rank: Feldmarschall-Leutnant and 2nd Colonel-Proprietor of the 3rd Hussar Regiment
- Conflicts: French Revolutionary Wars; War of the First Coalition; Battle of Jemappes; Battle of Neerwinden; Siege of Valenciennes; Siege of Mainz; Italian campaigns; Relief of Mantua; War of the Second Coalition; Italian campaigns; Battle of Verderio; Battle of Marengo; Battle of Pozzolo; Napoleonic Wars; War of the Sixth Coalition; German campaign of 1813; Battle of Leipzig; War of the Seventh Coalition; Neapolitan War; Battle of Ronco; Battle of Scapezzano; Battle of Tolentino
- Awards: (Austrian Empire) Tyrolean Silver Medal of Honor (1798) (Austrian Empire) Order of Maria Theresa (1801) (France) Order of the Légion d'Honneur (1810) (Sweden) Order of the Sword (1812) (Russian Empire) Order of St. George (1813) (Russian Empire) Order of St. Anna (1813) (Kingdom of Sardinia) Order of St. Maurice and St. Lazarus (1814); Order of St. Ferdinand and of Merit (1815); Sacred Military Constantinian Order of St. George (1816) (Austrian Empire) Order of Leopold (1825)
- Other work: Prime Minister and Ehren-Kavalier to Duchess Maria Luigia 1821–1829

Adam Albert, Count von Neipperg (8 April 1775 – 22 February 1829) was an Austrian general and statesman. He was the son of a diplomat famous for inventing a letter-copying machine, and the grandson of Count Wilhelm Reinhard von Neipperg. His second wife, Empress Marie-Louise, was the widow of Napoleon and a daughter of Francis II, the last Holy Roman Emperor and founding Emperor of the Austrian Empire.

== Early life ==
Adam Neipperg was born in Vienna as a son of Count Leopold von Neipperg (1728–1792) and his third wife, Countess Maria Wilhelmine von Hatzfeldt-Wildenburg (1750–1784). In 1766, the County of Neipperg, centred on Schwaigern, had become an Imperial State of the Holy Roman Empire, but was mediatised to the Kingdom of Württemberg in 1806.

Neipperg was educated at the Karlsschule military academy in Stuttgart. At the age of sixteen, Neipperg attempted to enlist in the French army at Strasbourg but, in 1791, he joined the ranks of the Austrians.

== Career ==
He participated in the Battle of Jemappes, Battle of Neerwinden, and Siege of Valenciennes. On 14 September 1794, at the village of Doel, on returning from one of many missions to deliver secret instructions to forts in the Dutch Republic, he became trapped behind enemy lines and received such serious bayonet wounds that he was left for dead; he lost his right eye in this skirmish. The following day, while burying the dead, the French found him still breathing and hospitalised him. Speaking French rather too well for a common soldier, he was assumed to be a traitor and sentenced to be shot once his health had returned. However, his convalescence was lengthy due to the seriousness of his injuries. By the time he recovered, the command having changed, he became part of a prisoner exchange. In a different account, he lost his eye not to a saber wound sustained in battle, but as a result of his maltreatment while being held prisoner by the French. He was unable to return to active duty for over a year. Neipperg rejoined the Austrian army and took part in the Battle of Mainz in 1795, and led Austrian troops in Italy, culminating at the disastrous Battle of Marengo in 1800 that drove the Austrians out of Italy. Following Marengo, Major Neipperg went to Paris in July 1800 as secretary to Feldmarschallleutnant Graf St. Julien, who was conducting peace negotiations with the French. When these failed in the autumn, he was appointed to 5th Ott Hussars on 1 December, distinguishing himself at the Battle of Pozzolo on 25 December. As the Oberstleutnant (Lt-colonel) of the same regiment, he fought in NE Italy again in the 1805 campaign, notably in the rearguard action on the Tagliamento. In 1806 he was appointed Oberst (colonel) of the regiment and directed the Neutrality and Frontier Cordon force, which observed the 1806-7 war.

=== Diplomatic career ===
In 1809, after the Austrian campaign, he was appointed ambassador to Sweden and encouraged Bernadotte to enter in the coalition which was formed in 1813. In reward for this service, he was decorated by the Swedish king. Neipperg rejoined the Austrian army and fought at Leipzig where he distinguished himself sufficiently to be appointed as lieutenant field marshal.

In 1814, Klemens von Metternich sent him to negotiate with the King of Naples, Joachim Murat, who signed a secret peace treaty with Austria in order to keep his throne. Metternich's other intrigue was to try to distance Prince Eugene (stepson of Napoleon and son-in-law of King Maximilian I Joseph of Bavaria) from the French. When Napoleon returned from exile, Murat once again allied with his brother-in-law the Emperor, triggering the Neapolitan War.

=== Later military career ===
Neipperg commanded a corps in the Austrian army (called the Army of Naples) under Field Marshal Frederick Bianchi. Murat dispatched General Carrascosa with a division of Neapolitan troops to prevent Neipperg's corps linking up with Bianchi and the Austrian main body. Neipperg defeated Carrascosa at Scapezzano on 1 May 1815. The main Neapolitan force under Murat's command attacked Bianchi's smaller force, which was in a strong defensive position, at Tolentino on 2 May 1815. The attack was renewed on 3 May and the Neapolitan force was gaining an advantage over the Austrians, when Murat received news of Carrascosa's defeat. With the threat of Neipperg's large force approaching his flank, Murat had to order the Neapolitan army to withdraw, turning Tolentino from a potential Napoleonic victory into a defeat.

In 1815, Neipperg participated in the short occupation of France. In July 1815, as the Austrian army crossed the Rhone, he took command of the troops in the French departments of Gard, Ardèche and Hérault. He was under the supervision of Bianchi, commanding the Austrian army in the south of France. He lived in Nîmes and left the city with the rest of the troops on 14 September 1815.

== Personal life ==
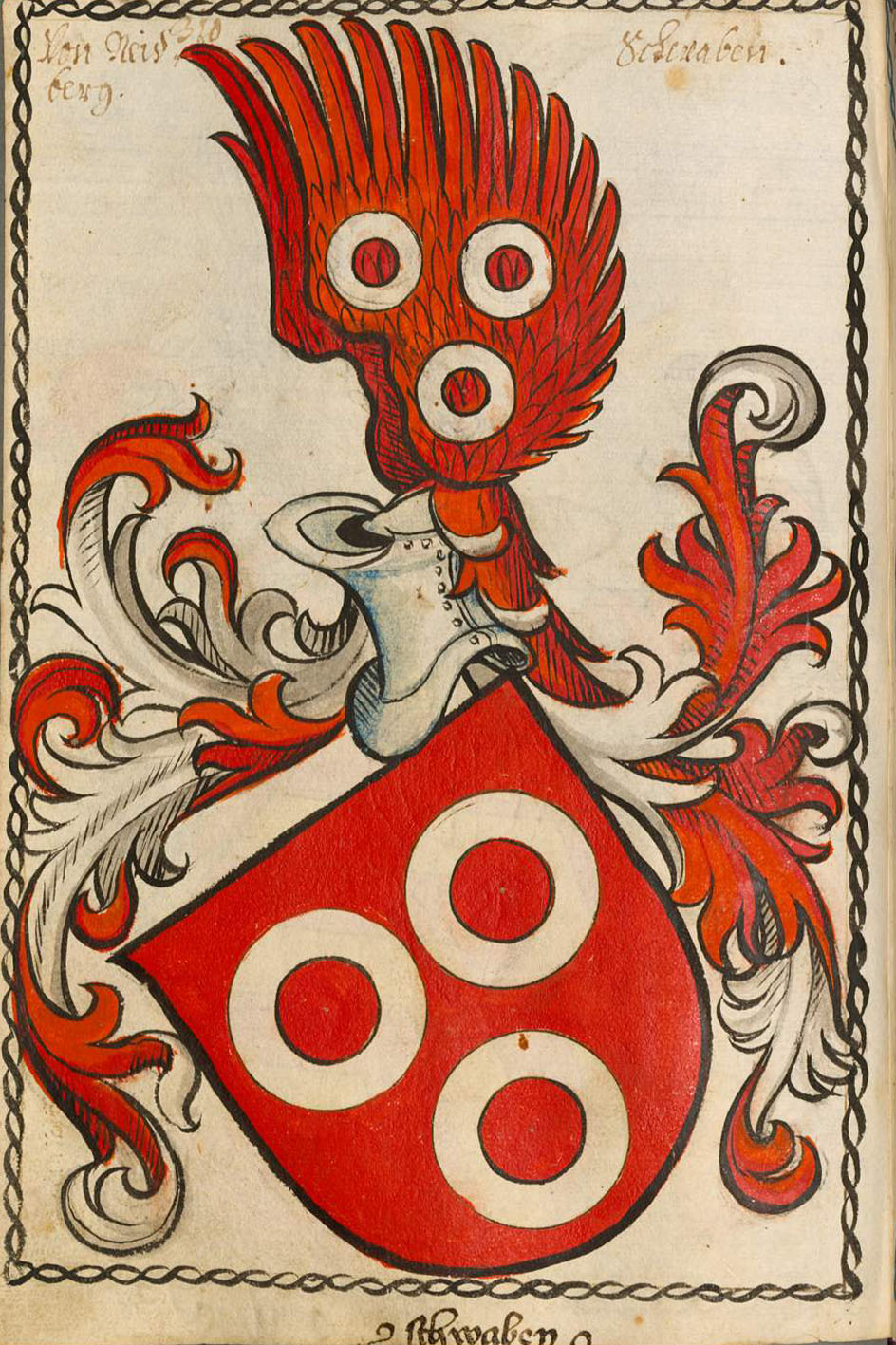
Neipperg family coat of arms

On 4 February 1806, Neipperg married Therese Josephine Walpurgis, Countess Pola (1778–1815). Before her death on 23 April 1815, they had four sons:

1. Count Alfred von Neipperg (1807–1865), who married Countess Giuseppina di Grisoni in 1835. After her death, he married Princess Marie Frederike Charlotte von Württemberg, daughter of King William I of Württemberg and Grand Duchess Catherine Pavlovna of Russia (a daughter of Tsar Paul I of Russia), in 1840.
2. Count Ferdinand von Neipperg (1809–1843), who died unmarried.
3. Count Gustav von Neipperg (1811–1850), who died unmarried.
4. Count Erwin von Neipperg (1813–1897), who married Countess Henriette von Waldstein-Wartenberg in 1845. After her death, he married Princess Maria Rosa von Lobkowicz, in 1852.

He was succeeded in the headship of the House of Neipperg by his eldest son Alfred who died childless and his brother Erwin followed him. The male heirs of this senior line of counts still live at Schwaigern in Germany. The present head of the house, Karl-Eugen, Count von Neipperg (born 1951), is the husband of Archduchess Andrea von Habsburg.

=== Second marriage ===
In August 1814, he was instructed to escort Napoleon's wife, the Empress Marie-Louise, to Aix-les-Bains to take the waters. However, the true purpose of his mission was to prevent the Empress from joining Napoleon in exile in Elba. Neipperg, who had understood this perfectly, was rumored to have told his mistress in Milan: "Inside of six months I shall be her lover, and soon her husband". The quote is most likely apocryphal, and at any rate, he did not need that long, as the Empress soon became his lover and talk of Elba never arose again.

Four months after the death of Napoleon I in 1821, he married Marie-Louise in a morganatic marriage. She had become sovereign Duchess of Parma, Piacenza, and Guastalla, styled Maria-Luigia di Parma, in the final act of the Congress of Vienna on 9 June 1815. From this union, four children were born, the first two before the marriage, while Marie-Louise was still legally married to Napoleon:

1. Countess Albertine di Montenuovo (Italian translation of Neipperg) (1817–1867), who married Luigi Sanvitale, Count di Fontanellato, in 1833.
2. William Albert, Count, then 1st Prince von Montenuovo (1819–1895), who married Countess Juliana Batthyány von Németújvár, in 1851.
3. Countess Mathilde di Montenuovo (1822-1823).
4. Count Gustav di Montenuovo (1823-?), who died young.

Neipperg died in Parma on 22 February 1829 of a heart condition. His descendants with Marie-Louise, the Princes von Montenuovo, intermarried with the Austro-Hungarian nobility and served as courtiers and diplomats at the Imperial Hofburg in Vienna, dying out in the male line in 1951.

== Ancestry ==
Ancestors of Adam Albert von Neipperg

16. Eberhard Wilhelm, Baron of Neipperg
8. Eberhard Friedrich, Baron of Neipperg
17. Margaretha Elisabeth von Sternenfels
4. Wilhelm Reinhard, Count of Neipperg
18. Reinhard von Hornberg
9. Margareta Lucretia von Hornberg
19. Anna Agnes von Buseck
2. Leopold Joseph, Count of Neipperg
20. Count Franz Christoph von Khevenhüller-Frankenburg
10. Count Franz Ferdinand von Khevenhüller-Frankenburg
21. Countess Faustina Barbara von Montecuccoli
5. Countess Maria Franziska Theresia von Khevenhüller-Frankenburg
22. Baron Mathias Franz von Lubetich-Chapelot
11. Baroness Maria Theresia von Lubetich-Chapelot
23. Countess Theresia Isabella von Lodron
1. Adam Albert, Count of Neipperg
24. Baron Melchior Friedrich von Hatzfeld
12. Baron Wilhelm Franz von Hatzfeld
25. Baroness Maria Barbara von Fürstenberg
6. Count Karl Ferdinand von Hatzfeldt-Wildenburg
26. Baron Philipp Christoph von Loë
13. Baroness Sophie Therese von Loë
27. Baroness Anna Maria Theresia von Winckelhausen
3. Countess Marie Wilhelmine von Hatzfeldt-Wildenburg
28. Adolf Karl von Bettendorff
14. Baron Lothar Karl von Bettendorff
29. Baroness Maria Catharina Kämmerer von Worms-Dalberg
7. Baroness Marie Sophie von Bettendorff
30. Count Johann Philipp von Stadion-Warthausen
15. Countess Marie Sophie von Stadion
31. Countess Maria Anna von Schönborn-Buchheim

== Sources ==
- Translated from: fr:Adam Albert de Neipperg

Political offices
Preceded by Filippo Magawly Cerati	Prime Minister of Duchy of Parma; 1823–1829	Succeeded by Joseph von Werklein
