= Battle of Tolentino =

1815 battle during the Neapolitan War

- Part of the Neapolitan War
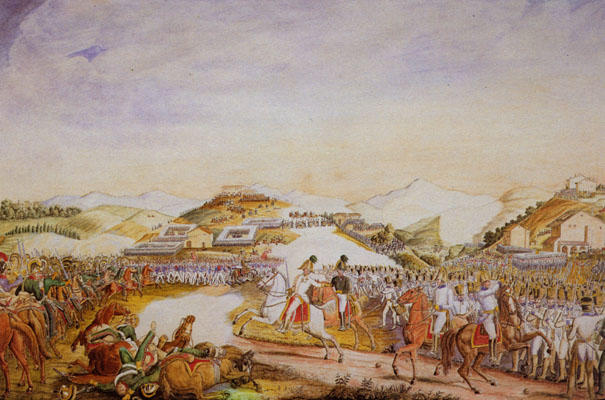
- The Battle of Tolentino by Vincenzo Milizia
Date	2–3 May 1815
Location	Tolentino, Macerata, present-day Italy 43°12′49″N 13°17′28″E
Result	Austrian victory: King Murat of Naples is forced to flee Naples and later Captured and Executed.; Treaty of Casalanza signed on 20 May 1815.; Ferdinand I replaces Murat of Naples as King on May 22 1815.

Belligerents
Austrian Empire; Grand Duchy of Tuscany	Kingdom of Naples

Commanders and leaders
(Austrian Empire) Frederick Bianchi	(Kingdom of Naples) Joachim Murat (executed) (Kingdom of Naples) Michele Carrascosa (Kingdom of Naples) Guglielmo Pepe

Units involved
(Austrian Empire) I Corps	(Kingdom of Naples) Guard Division (Kingdom of Naples) 2nd Division (Kingdom of Naples) 3rd Division (Kingdom of Naples) 4th Division (Kingdom of Naples) Cavalry Division

Strength
11,938 men 1,452 horses 28 guns	25,588 men 4,790 horses 58 guns

Casualties and losses
800 total: 700 killed 100 wounded	4,120 total: 1,120 killed 600 wounded 2,400 captured
- Location within Europe

The Battle of Tolentino was fought from 2–3 May 1815 near Tolentino, Kingdom of Naples in what is now Marche, Italy: it was the decisive battle in the Neapolitan War, fought by the Napoleonic King of Naples Joachim Murat to keep the throne after the Congress of Vienna. The battle occurred during the Hundred Days following Napoleon's return from exile and, like the Battle of Waterloo, resulted in a decisive victory for the Seventh Coalition, leading to the restoration of the previous Bourbon king, Ferdinand I.

== Background ==
By the end of April 1815, Murat had lost all the early gains he made at the start of the war as two advancing Austrian corps under the command of Generals Bianchi and Neipperg forced the Neapolitans south-east to a base in Ancona. The two Austrian corps had become separated on either side of the Apennine Mountains and Murat hoped to defeat Bianchi to the west before quickly turning on Neipperg, who had been pursuing his retreat from the north.

Murat planned to face Bianchi near the town of Tolentino. Dispatching a small force under General Michele Carrascosa to delay Neipperg, Murat moved his main force to meet Bianchi. On 29 April, a small advance party of Hungarian hussars routed the small Neapolitan garrison stationed in Tolentino. With the Austrian vanguard already established in Tolentino, Murat's army camped to the north east in Macerata. Bianchi realised Murat's plan and decided to delay Murat for as long as possible. The Austrians established a defensive line based on the Tower of San Catervo, with further troops being positioned at Rancia Castle, the church of Maestà and at Saint Joseph. Murat had to force the issue and march on Bianchi. The two armies met on 2 May.

== Battle ==
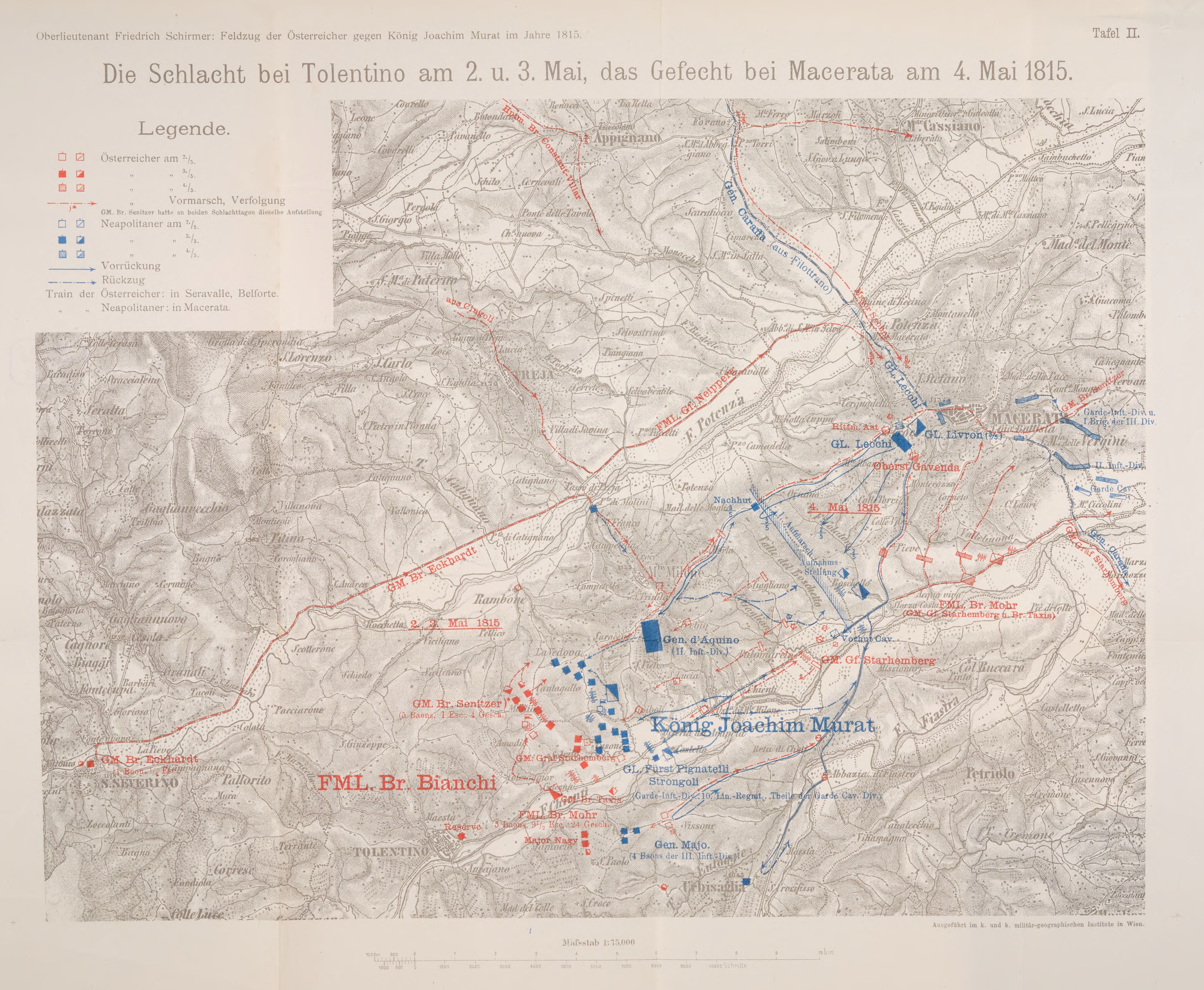
Map of the Battle of Tolentino, 2-3 May 1815

The battle opened at dawn with an artillery bombardment from both sides on the valley leading north to Sforzacosta. Although the Austrians were already established around Tolentino, Murat managed to catch them by surprise. In the opening engagements, Neapolitan troops managed to surround and capture General Bianchi near Sforzacosta but he was almost immediately freed by a regiment of Hungarian hussars. By mid morning, the Neapolitan army had concentrated near Pollenza, with fierce fighting in the area. During the day, the main action occurred around the Austrian outpost at Rancia Castle, which changed hands many times. By the end of the first day, although the Neapolitan army had the upper hand and had made slight gains, including Monte Milone, the Austrians were still in an excellent defensive position.

On the second day, fog delayed the start of battle until 7:00 a.m. The day started well for Murat as the Neapolitan army managed to take Rancia Castle as well as the hills of Cantagallo. From here, the Neapolitans staged a further attack on the Austrian positions. Two Neapolitan infantry divisions, including Murat's Guard Division, descended from Monte Milone against the Austrian left flank.

The Neapolitans made the mistake of forming square, expecting a swift cavalry counter-attack, which never happened. The Austrian infantry delivered a series of volleys, supported by devastating artillery fire. General Mohr (de) had also repulsed an attack on the Austrian right and the entire Neapolitan line fell back to Pollenza. With the result of the battle still undecided, Murat received word Neipperg had defeated Carascosa at the Battle of Scapezzano and was approaching. To make matters worse, he received false rumours that a British fleet had just unloaded a Sicilian army in the south of Italy, threatening his line of retreat. Unbeknownst to Murat, the British fleet was instead sailing to blockade Naples and Ancona. Murat sounded the retreat and the fighting ended.

== Aftermath ==
The battle resulted in a decisive Austrian victory. The Neapolitans lost over 4,000 men and the Austrians 800. Afterwards the Neapolitans would be beaten by Hungarian cavalry at Castel di Sangro and the remains of the shattered Neapolitan army would be finished at San Germano. Meanwhile, the entire Neapolitan fleet surrendered to the Royal Navy to avoid bombardment of the Neapolitan capital.

Murat fell back to Naples but with the Austrians approaching by land and the British by sea, he had no choice but to flee to Corsica, disguised as a Danish sailor. The battle proved decisive; on 20 May 1815, Austria and Naples concluded the Treaty of Casalanza, restoring Ferdinand IV to the throne.

Preceded by Battle of Scapezzano	Napoleonic Wars; Battle of Tolentino	Succeeded by Siege of Ancona
