= Frederick Bianchi, Duke of Casalanza =

Austrian general (1768–1855)

Vinzenz Ferrerius Friedrich Freiherr von Bianchi, Duke of Casalanza
- Vinzenz Ferrerius Friedrich Freiherr von Bianchi; Vincenzo Federico Barone Bianchi
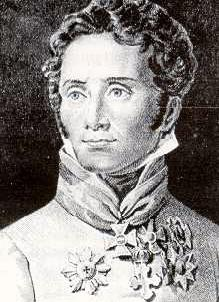
- Born: 1 February 1768; Vienna, Austrian Empire
- Died: 18 August 1855 (aged 87); Sauerbrunn, Austrian Empire (now Rogaška Slatina, Slovenia
- Military career
- Allegiance: Holy Roman Empire; Austrian Empire
- Branch: Army of the Holy Roman Empire; Imperial and Royal Army
- Service years: 1787–1824
- Rank: Feldmarschallleutnant
- Conflicts: Austro-Turkish War (1788–1791); French Revolutionary Wars; Battle of Rivoli; Napoleonic Wars; Battle of Aspern; French invasion of Russia; German campaign of 1813; Campaign in north-east France (1814); Battle of Mâcon; Neapolitan War; Battle of the Panaro; Battle of Carpi; Battle of Tolentino
- Awards: Military Order of Maria Theresa; Cross of St. George

Vinzenz Ferrerius Friedrich Freiherr von Bianchi, Duke of Casalanza (1 February 1768 – 18 August 1855), was an Austrian Feldmarschallleutnant who notably served during the Napoleonic Wars.

== Early life ==
Born in Vienna, Bianchi studied at the Imperial Engineering Academy. In 1788, serving in the Austro-Turkish War, the sub-lieutenant distinguished himself at the siege of Bubitza. During the French Revolutionary Wars he was appointed captain after the Siege of Valenciennes in 1793. In 1796 he was in Italy as staff officer under Dagobert Sigmund von Wurmser's command. He captured French aide-de-camp Joachim Murat at Brescia. While commanding the six battalions of the Count of Lusignan's regiment at the Battle of Rivoli, he was taken prisoner, but released at the request of General József Alvinczi.

In 1799, as a Lieutenant-Colonel, he was attaché to young Archduke Ferdinand; then to Archduke Charles during the campaign in Germany and Switzerland. He was promoted to colonel in three months, leading the 48th Regiment of Hungarian infantry. In 1804, he put down a revolt at Cattaro, on the Dalmatian coast.

== General ==
After serving as Adjutant-general of the Army of Germany he again commanded the 48th Regiment until 1807, when he was made Generalmajor. In 1808 he married Friederike Liebetrau von Maixdorf (1780–1838). Their son Frederick (1812–1865) would eventually become a general as well and likewise rise to the rank of Feldmarschallleutnant.

From 3 to 5 June 1809, he confronted Marshal Louis Nicolas Davout, denying him the bridgehead over the Danube near Pressburg, and was awarded the Knight's Cross of the Military Order of Maria Theresa. He was then made Feldmarschallleutnant (Lieutenant field marshal), with the Infantry Regiment No. 63 as his personal regiment, and inspector of infantry in Hungary. In 1812, after Austria had been forced into a military alliance with France, Bianchi commanded the 1st Division of the Army of Karl Philip of Schwarzenberg; taking part in Napoleon's Russian campaign.

In the German campaign of 1813 he only just kept his division at the Freyburg gate of Dresden, which he had tried to assault until he was attacked by Napoleon. He distinguished himself at the Battle of Leipzig and was afterwards awarded the Cross of St. George by Tsar Alexander I of Russia. In 1814, he commanded an army corps which participated in diverse fighting around Moret-sur-Loing. He was then sent to Dijon to halt Marshal Pierre Augereau's army and was victorious in the smaller Battle of Mâcon on 11 March 1814.

During the Neapolitan War in 1815, he served as a corps commander and was dispatched to southern Italy with a 20,000-strong force to prevent Joachim Murat, the King of Naples, from conquering Italy. He eventually was made commander of the small army, commanding his own corps and that of Adam Albert von Neipperg. He gained a decisive victory against Murat at the Battle of Tolentino, which earned him the title of Duke of Casalanza from Ferdinand I of the Two Sicilies.

== Retirement ==
Afterwards, he served in the Hofkriegsrat. In 1824, he retired to a relatively private life, moving to an estate in Mogliano Veneto that he had purchased in 1821; there he started vineyards that still bear his name. His presence was unremarkable until 1848, when the revolutions of 1848 in the Habsburg areas made him an enemy representative of the Austrian power, for which he was arrested and imprisoned in Treviso. Two months later, the imperial army reconquered the territories and freed Duke Bianchi.

He died at Sauerbrunn in Styria, Austria, (now Rogaška Slatina, Slovenia) where he had moved temporarily to avoid a cholera epidemic that was ravaging Mogliano; the remains of the body were translated to his villa in 1864.
