= Neapolitan War =

Conflict between the Kingdom of Naples and the Austrian Empire in 1815

- Part of the War of the Seventh Coalition
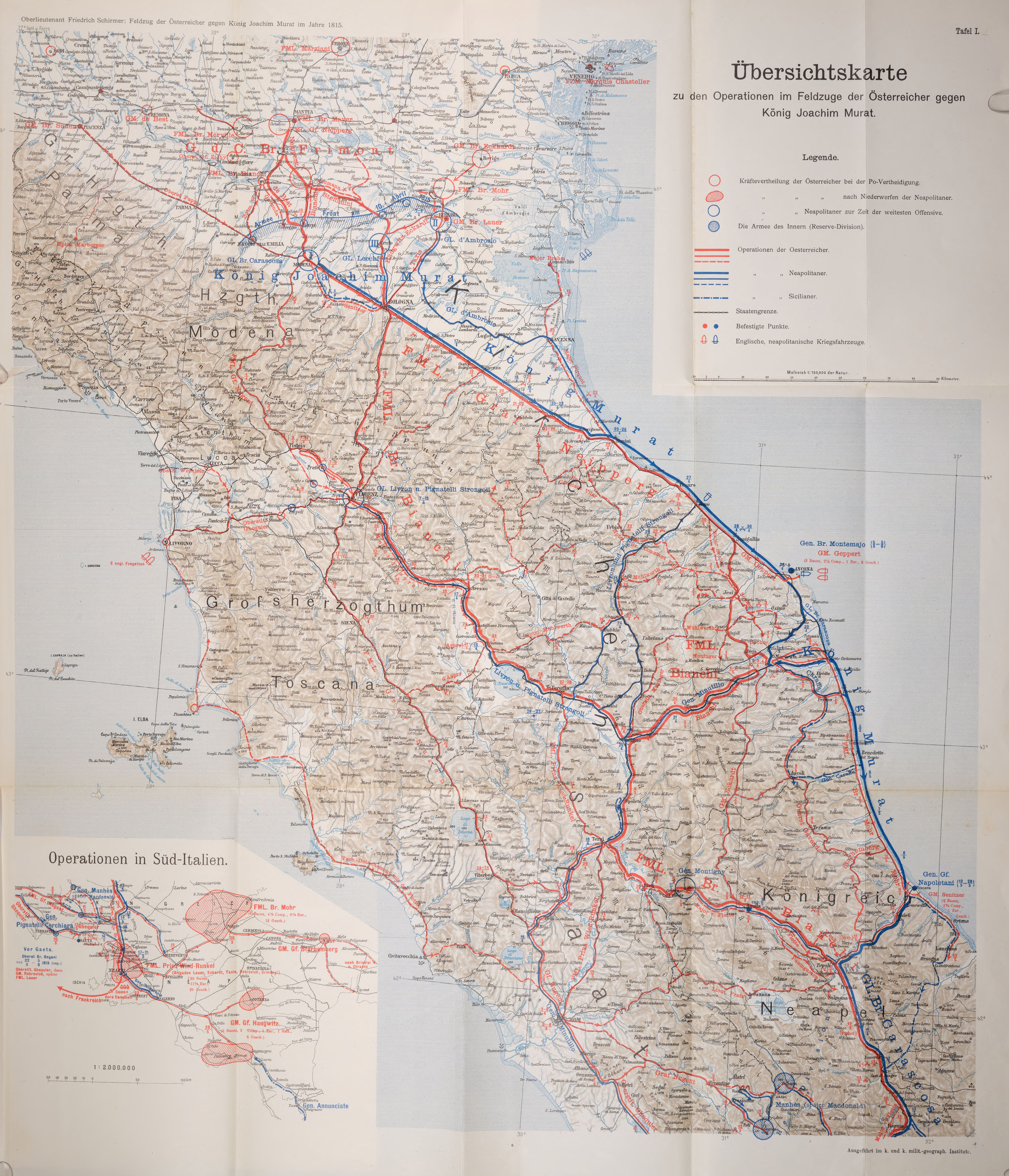
- Map of the Neapolitan War
Date	15 March – 20 May 1815 (2 months and 5 days)
Location	Italy
Result	Austrian victory: Treaty of Casalanza; Murat ousted from Neapolitan throne

Belligerents
Austrian Empire; Grand Duchy of Tuscany; United Kingdom^{[a]}; Kingdom of Sicily; Supported by: Prussia; Russia	Kingdom of Naples; Supported by: French Empire^{[b]}

Commanders and leaders
(Austrian Empire) Johann Frimont; (Austrian Empire) Frederick Bianchi; (Austrian Empire) Adam Albert von Neipperg; (Austrian Empire) Laval Nugent von Westmeath	(Kingdom of Naples) Joachim Murat (executed); (Kingdom of Naples) Michele Carrascosa; (Kingdom of Naples) Guglielmo Pepe; (Kingdom of Naples) Pietro Colletta

Units involved
(Austrian Empire) Imperial Austrian Army	Army of the Kingdom of Naples

Strength
60,000 (in Lombardy); 35,000 (engaged in war)	82,000 (reported by Murat); 50,000 (actual)

Casualties and losses
+3,024 killed, wounded or captured	+19,698 killed, wounded or captured
- 1. Declared war on Naples in early April 1815.; 2. Officially an ally of Naples, although never committed troops to the war

The Neapolitan War, also known as the Austro-Neapolitan War, was a conflict between the Napoleonic Kingdom of Naples and the Austrian Empire. It started on 15 March 1815, when King Joachim Murat declared war on Austria, and ended on 20 May 1815, with the signing of the Treaty of Casalanza. The war occurred during the Hundred Days between Napoleon's return from exile and before he left Paris to be decisively defeated at the Battle of Waterloo. The war was triggered by a pro-Napoleon uprising in Naples and ended with a decisive Austrian victory at the Battle of Tolentino, after which Bourbon monarch Ferdinand IV was reinstated as King of Naples and Sicily. Many say the declaration of war was a reckless decision by Murat. However, the intervention by Austria caused resentment in Italy, which further spurred the drive towards Italian unification.

== Background ==
Before the French Revolutionary Wars the Kingdom of Naples was ruled by Bourbon King Ferdinand IV. Ferdinand was a natural opponent of Napoleon and was allied with the Third Coalition against him. However, after defeat at the Battle of Austerlitz and the Treaty of Pressburg, Ferdinand was forced to cede Naples to the French in early 1806.

Initially, Napoleon's brother, Joseph Bonaparte, ruled Naples. Then in 1808, Joseph was installed by Napoleon as King of Spain which led to the Peninsular War, and Napoleon installed his brother-in-law, Joachim Murat, as King of Naples.

Murat originally ruled Naples following the same legal and social system used in France, whilst still participating in Napoleon's campaigns. But following the disastrous Battle of Leipzig, Murat abandoned the Grande Armée to try to save his throne. As defeat in the War of the Sixth Coalition loomed, Murat increasingly moved away from a hapless Napoleon, eventually signing a treaty with Austria in January 1814 and joining the Allied side.

But as the Congress of Vienna progressed, Murat's position became less and less secure as there was growing support to restore Ferdinand to the throne. The most vocal of all Murat's opponents was the United Kingdom, which had never recognized Murat's claim to the throne and, moreover, had been guarding Ferdinand in Sicily, ensuring he retained the Sicilian throne.

When Murat was informed of Napoleon's plan to escape from exile in Elba on 1 March 1815, Murat sided with him once more and declared war on Austria as soon as he learned of Napoleon's return to France.

== War ==
=== Neapolitan advance ===
Joachim Murat declared war on Austria on 15 March 1815, five days before Napoleon's return to Paris and the beginning of his Hundred Days. The Austrians were prepared for war after their suspicions were raised when Murat applied for permission weeks earlier to move his troops through Austrian land in order to attack the south of France. Austria had reinforced their armies in Lombardy under the command of Count Heinrich von Bellegarde prior to war being declared.

At the start of the war, Murat reportedly had 82,000 men in his army, including 7,000 cavalry and 90 cannons, although this figure was grossly exaggerated to try to encourage Italians to join his cause. The real number was somewhere in the region of 50,000 men.

Leaving behind a reserve Army of the Interior in case of an invasion from Sicily, he sent his two elite Guard Divisions through the Papal States, forcing the Pope to flee to Genoa. With the remainder of his army, Murat established his headquarters at Ancona and advanced on the road towards Bologna. On 30 March, Murat had arrived in Rimini, where he gave the famous Rimini Proclamation, inciting all Italian nationalists to war.

The Italian population was mostly wary of Habsburg Austria, as they feared the increasing Austrian influence in Italy. Under the terms settled by the Congress of Vienna, direct Austrian rule was imposed on Milan 19 years after Napoleon's invasion. Habsburg princes had also been reinstated in the Grand Duchy of Tuscany and the Duchy of Modena.

Murat was hoping that an Austrian army in Naples would prove too much and that the Italian population would rise up in support of his cause. However, no such general insurrection occurred, as any unrest was quickly quashed by the Austrian authorities, and Murat found few Italians outside Naples who were willing to take up arms and join his cause. Many saw Murat as a man trying to save his crown rather than a beacon of Italian unification.

By now, the number of Austrian troops in Lombardy had swelled to 60,000, and the commander entrusted with the force to confront Murat was Baron Johann Maria Philipp Frimont. The army was originally intended to invade southern France after Napoleon's return, but now had to be diverted to face the approaching Neapolitan army. Frimont moved his headquarters to Piacenza in order to block any potential advance on Milan.

Meanwhile, on the same day that Murat gave the Rimini Proclamation, the Austrian advance guard, under the command of General Frederick Bianchi, was beaten back at an engagement near Cesena. Bianchi retreated towards Modena and took up a defensive line behind the River Panaro, allowing Murat to take Bologna on 3 April.

Murat engaged Bianchi again at the Battle of the Panaro; the Austrians were defeated and driven back. The Austrian vanguard was forced to retreat to Borgoforte, allowing the Neapolitans to advance on Modena.

Following the battle, the division under the command of General Michele Carrascosa immediately occupied Modena, Carpi, and Reggio Emilia, while Murat moved against Ferrara. However, the garrison in Ferrara withstood the best efforts of the Neapolitans to take the citadel, tying up a large number of Neapolitan troops in a costly siege.

On 8 April, Murat attempted to cross the Po River and finally set foot in Austrian-controlled Italy. Murat had received little reinforcement from the Italian populace up to this point, but he hoped he would find more support north of the Po River, which was under direct Austrian rule.

The region had once been part of the Kingdom of Italy, a French client state, and it had been reported that about 40,000 men, mostly veterans of Napoleon's campaigns, were ready to join Murat once he arrived in Milan. He chose a crossing at the town of Occhiobello. It was there that Murat finally engaged with the bulk of the Austrian army under the command of Frimont.

Meanwhile, the two Guard Divisions Murat had sent into the Papal States had passed unmolested into Tuscany, and by 8 April they had occupied Florence, the capital of the Grand Duchy of Tuscany. Ferdinand III fled to Pisa, while the Austrian garrison in Florence, under the command of General Laval Nugent von Westmeath, was forced to retreat to Pistoia, with the Neapolitan army in pursuit.

But with reinforcements arriving from the north and his army in a strong defensive position, Nugent was able to turn and halt the Neapolitan pursuit. Murat and the Neapolitans had reached the zenith of their campaign.

=== Austrian counterattack ===
The Battle of Occhiobello proved to be the turning point of the war. Murat's attempts to cross the River Po proved unsuccessful, and after two days of heavy fighting, the Neapolitans fell back after suffering over 2,000 casualties. To make matters worse, the United Kingdom declared war on Murat and sent a fleet to Italy.

Meanwhile, Frimont had ordered a counterattack to try to relieve the garrison in Ferrara. He ordered a corps under the command of Bianchi to advance on Carpi, which was guarded by a brigade under the command of Guglielmo Pepe.

Another column was ordered to cut off Pepe's line of retreat. However, Carrascosa, who was in command of the Neapolitan troops around Modena, saw the Austrian trap and ordered a retreat to a defensive line behind the Panaro, where he was joined by the remainder of his division, which had been evacuated from Reggio Emilia and Modena.

But even after Carrascosa's retreat, Murat was still in a position to continue the siege at Ferrara. In response, Frimont ordered a corps under the command of General Adam Albert von Neipperg to attack his entrenched right flank. On 12 April, after bitter fighting at the Battle of Casaglia, the Neapolitan troops were driven from their entrenched positions.

Murat was forced to lift the Siege of Ferrara and retreat back on the road to Bologna. On 14 April, Frimont attempted to force a crossing of the Panaro but was repelled. However, only two days later, Murat and his army retreated from Bologna, which was quickly retaken by the Austrians.

In Tuscany, meanwhile, Murat's two Guard Divisions also inexplicably retreated without being harassed in any way by Nugent. By 15 April, the Austrians had retaken Florence, and when the news reached Murat, he ordered a general retreat of his main force back to their original headquarters in Ancona.

With the road to Florence now clear and the Italian peninsula opening up in front of him, Frimont ordered two corps south to deal with Murat once and for all. Bianchi's corps was ordered to march towards Foligno via Florence in an attempt to threaten the rear of the Neapolitans and to cut off their line of direct retreat, whilst Neipperg's corps was sent into direct pursuit of Murat as he retired to Ancona.

With the war turning in Austria's favour, Frimont was ordered back to Lombardy to oversee the army that was now amassing in preparation for an invasion of France. A large portion of the Austrian force was also recalled, leaving only three Austrian corps totalling around 35,000 men in central Italy.

Murat, who placed too much faith in his Guard Divisions, believing they would be able to halt the advance of Bianchi and Nugent, retreated slowly, even turning to check the pursuit at the Ronco and Savio rivers.

But the Austrian advanced guard caught the retreating Neapolitan force twice by surprise, at Cesenatico and Pesaro. Murat hurried his retreat, and by late April, his main force had arrived safely in Ancona, where he was reunited with his two Guard Divisions.

=== Battle of Tolentino ===
Meanwhile, Bianchi's corps had made swift progress. Arriving in Florence on 20 April, they had reached their target of Foligno by 26 April and now threatened Murat's line of retreat. Neipperg's corps was still in pursuit, and by 29 April, his advanced guard had arrived in Fano, just two days' march away.

However, the two Austrian armies were separated, and Murat hoped to quickly defeat Bianchi before turning on Neipperg. Much like Napoleon's tactics before Waterloo, Murat sent a division under Carrascosa north to stall Neipperg while his main force headed west to face Bianchi.

Murat originally planned to face Bianchi near the town of Tolentino, but on 29 April, Bianchi's advance guard succeeded in driving out the small Neapolitan garrison there. Bianchi, having arrived first, then formed a defensive position around the hills to the east of Tolentino.

With Neipperg's army approaching from his rear, Murat was forced to give battle at Tolentino on 2 May 1815. After two days of inconclusive fighting, Murat learned that Neipperg had outmanoeuvred and defeated Carrascosa at the Battle of Scapezzano and was approaching. Sensing the inevitable, Murat ordered a retreat.

The battle had severely damaged the morale of the Neapolitan troops, and many senior officers had been casualties in the battle. The battered Neapolitan army fell back in disarray. On 5 May, a joint Anglo-Austrian fleet began a blockade of Ancona, eventually taking the entire garrison of the city as prisoners.

By 12 May, Bianchi, who was now in command of both his and Neipperg's corps, had taken the town of L'Aquila along with its castle. The main Austrian army was now marching on Popoli.

During this time, General Nugent had continued to advance from Florence. Having arrived in Rome on 30 April, allowing the Pope to return, Nugent advanced towards Ceprano. By mid-May, Nugent had intercepted Murat at San Germano (now Cassino).

Here, Murat attempted to check Nugent's advance, but with the main Austrian force under Bianchi in pursuit, Murat was forced to call off the action on 16 May. Soon afterwards, the Austrian armies united near Calvi and began the march on Naples.

Murat was forced to flee to Corsica and later Cannes disguised as a sailor on a Danish ship after a British fleet blockaded Naples and destroyed all the Neapolitan gunboats in the harbour.

On 20 May, Neapolitan Generals Pepe and Carrascosa sued for peace and concluded the Treaty of Casalanza with the Austrians, bringing the war to an end. On 23 May, the main Austrian army entered Naples and restored King Ferdinand to the Neapolitan throne.

Murat, meanwhile, would attempt to reclaim his kingdom. Coming back from exile, he landed with 28 men at Pizzo, Calabria on 8 October 1815. However, unlike Napoleon months earlier, Murat was not greeted with a warm welcome and was soon captured by Bourbon troops.

Five days after he landed at Pizzo, he was executed in the town's castle, exhorting the firing squad to spare his face. This ended the final chapter of the Neapolitan Wars.

== Aftermath ==
Shortly after the end of the war, the Kingdoms of Naples and Sicily were finally united to create the Kingdom of the Two Sicilies. Although the two kingdoms had been ruled by the same king since 1721, the formal union did not happen until 1816. King Ferdinand IV of Naples and III of Sicily would become King Ferdinand I of the Two Sicilies. Meanwhile, the Austrians consolidated their gains in Northern Italy into the Kingdom of Lombardy–Venetia.

Although Joachim Murat failed to save his crown or start a popular nationalist movement with the Rimini Proclamation, he indirectly and unintentionally ignited a desire for Italian unification. Indeed, some consider the Rimini Proclamation to be the start of the Risorgimento. The intervention of Austria only heightened the fact that the Habsburgs were the single most powerful opponent to unification, which would eventually lead to three wars of independence against the Austrians.

== See also ==
- History of Naples
- Napoleonic Wars
- Risorgimento
- Timeline of the Napoleonic era
