= Michele Carrascosa =

Neapolitan general and politician (1774–1853)

Baron Michele Carrascosa
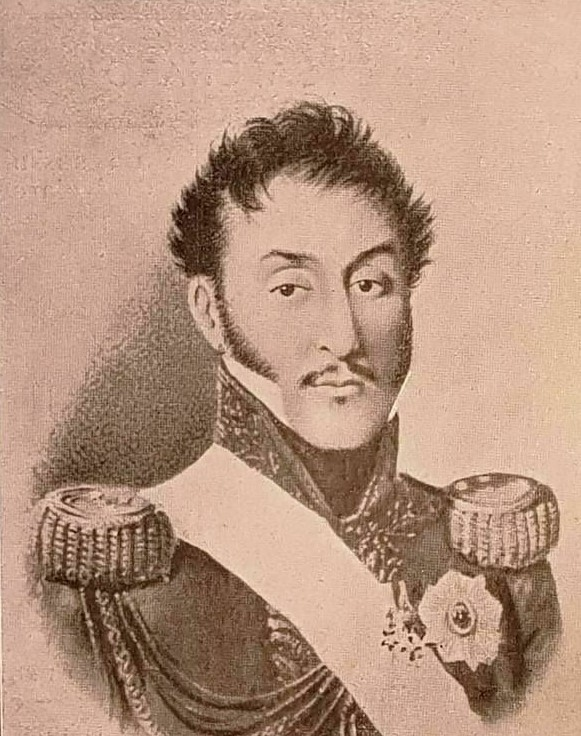
- Born: 11 April 1774; Kingdom of Naples
- Died: 10 May 1853 (aged 79); Naples, Kingdom of the Two Sicilies
- Military career
- Allegiance: Habsburg monarchy Parthenopean Republic; French Empire; Kingdom of Naples; Kingdom of the Two Sicilies
- Rank: General
- Commands: Neapolitan Army
- Conflicts: French Revolutionary Wars; Battle of Lodi; Napoleonic Wars; Peninsular War; Neapolitan War

Michele Carrascosa (1774–1853) was a Neapolitan general and politician.

Born to a Spanish family in Naples that came to Italy with Charles III of Spain, Carrascosa was, along with his brother Rafaelle, a career soldier. He fought against the French in the Battle of Lodi in 1796, in which he was wounded, but later joined the French-allied Parthenopean Republic. When the short-lived republic fell, Carrascosa was captured and exiled by Bourbon troops. He joined the French forces in the Peninsular War in Spain before returning to Naples, which was now a Kingdom controlled by Napoleon's brother-in-law, Joachim Murat. Murat appointed Carrascosa military governor of Naples and made him a Baron of the Kingdom.

He was in command of the Neapolitan army during the Neapolitan War of 1815, where he signed the Treaty of Casalanza after Murat fled to Corsica. From 1815 he was a general in the army of the restored Kingdom of Two Sicilies.

Following a series of scandals in 1823, Carrascosa was again exiled from Naples, this time in England, and did not return until 1848, where he was once more in good standing with the kingdom, and was appointed to the House of Peers.
