= Aron Stanisavljević von Wellenstreit =

Military officer

Aron Freiherr Stanisavljević von Wellenstreit Aron Stanissavlevics von Wellenstreit
- Born: 1753; Syrmia
- Died: 18 August 1833 (aged 79–80); Petrovaradin, Slavonian Military Frontier
- Military career
- Allegiance: Habsburg Monarchy; Austrian Empire
- Branch: Army
- Service years: 1778–1833
- Rank: Feldmarschalleutnant
- Wars: War of the Bavarian Succession; Russo-Turkish War (1787–1792); Italian campaigns of the French Revolutionary Wars; War of the Sixth Coalition; Italian campaign of 1813–1814
- Awards: Order of Leopold

Aron Freiherr Stanisavljević von Wellenstreit (1753 – 18 August 1833) was an Austrian Lieutenant Field Marshal of Serb origin who served in the War of the Bavarian Succession, the Russo-Turkish War, the French Revolutionary Wars, and the Napoleonic Wars.

== Biography ==
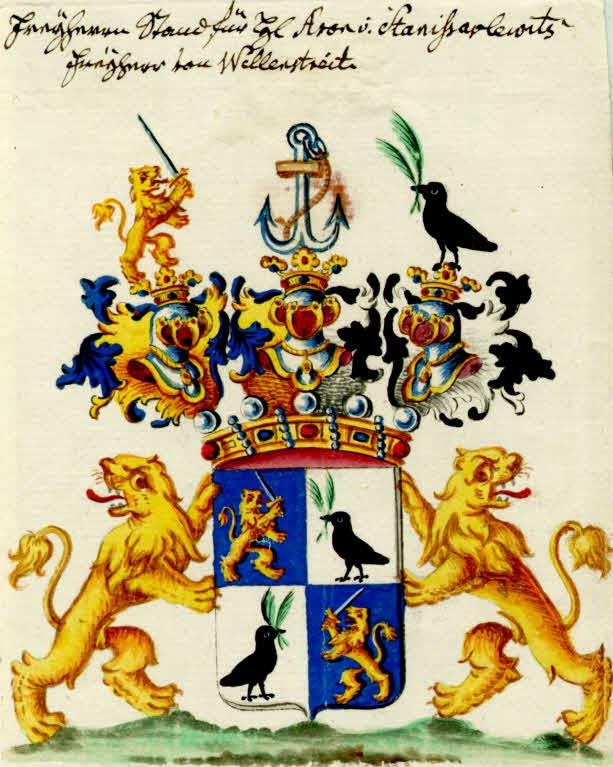
Coat of arms of Stanisavljević von Wellenstreit in the National Archives of Austria

The son of a commander of the Tschaikisten river flotilla troops, Stanisavljević was educated at the Imperial and Royal Technical Military Academy in Vienna before enlisting in the Austrian Army. His first posting was to his father's Tschaikisten battalion, where he was promoted to Lieutenant. He moved to the pontoon corps in 1785. In 1813, Stanisavljević was promoted to Major General and led one of the brigades of the army of Johann von Hiller during the Italian campaign of 1813–1814. He was promoted to Lieutenant Field Marshal in 1825 and elevated to Baron in 1828. In 1830, Stanisavljević was made commander of the fortress of Königgrätz. He then served as commander of Petrovaradin Fortress from 1831 until his retirement in 1833, shortly before his death. He was buried in a family crypt at the Serbian Orthodox Kovilj Monastery.
