= Italian campaign of 1813–1814 =

Italian campaign during The War of the Sixth Coalition

- Part of the War of the Sixth Coalition
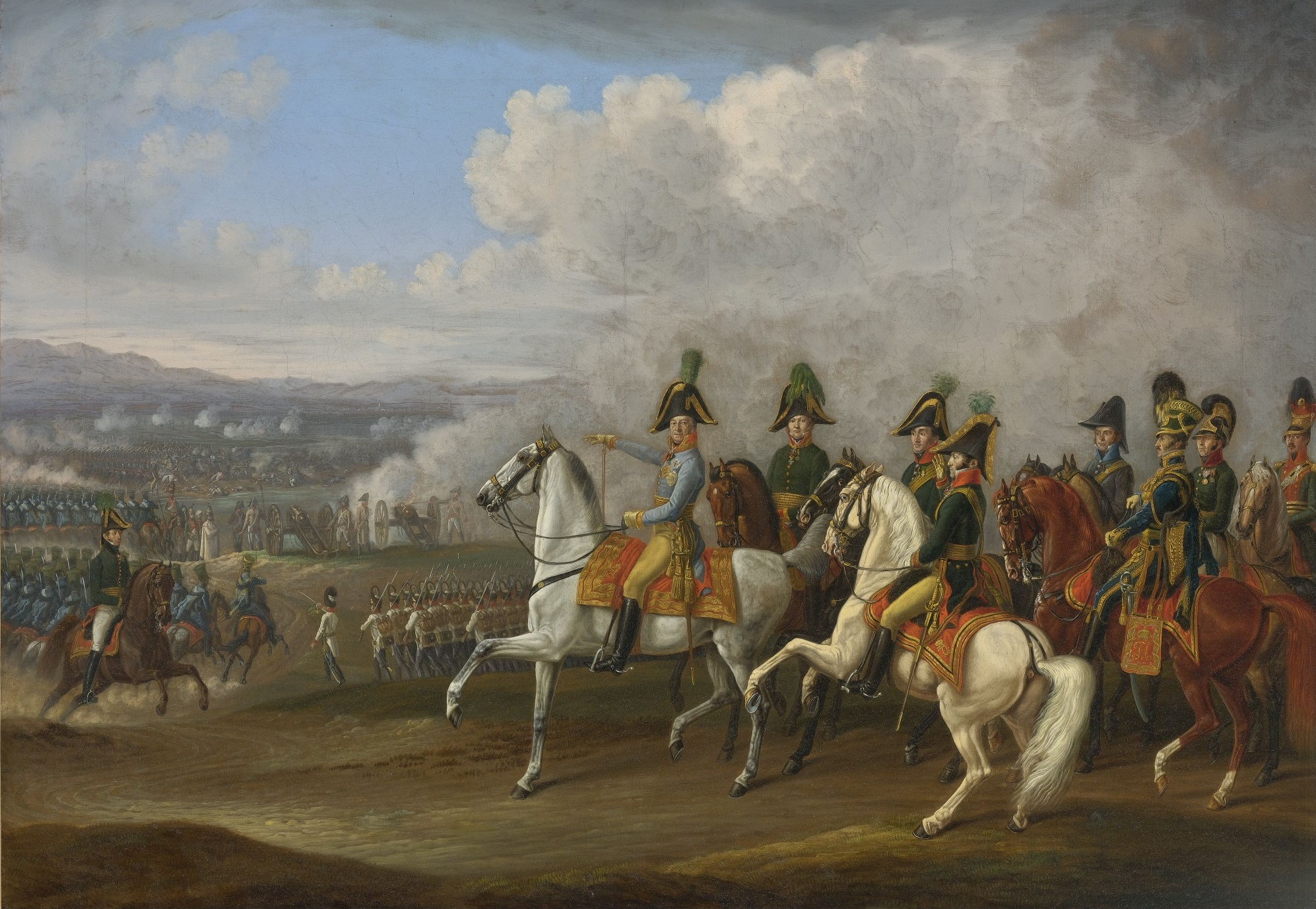
- General von Bellegarde and his staff in a painting by Albrecht Adam, 1815
Date	12 August 1813 – 16 April 1814 (Note: Convention of Schiarino-Rizzino) (8 months and 4 days)
Location	Italy, Austria, Slovenia and Croatia
Result	Coalition victory
Territorial changes	Dissolution of the Kingdom of Italy; Illyrian Provinces annexed by Austria; Restoration of some Italian pre-unification states

Belligerents
Austrian Empire; United Kingdom; Kingdom of Naples (from January 1814); Kingdom of Sicily; Kingdom of Sardinia	France; Kingdom of Italy; Kingdom of Naples (until January 1814) (Note: Only de jure, in fact, the Kingdom of Naples did not participate in military operations alongside the French Empire, because King Joachim Murat was negotiating with the Coalition to change sides.)

Commanders and leaders
Heinrich Johann Bellegarde; Laval Nugent von Westmeath; Johann von Hiller; Paul von Radivojevich; Franjo Tomašić; Anton Gundakar von Starhemberg; William Bentinck; Henry Tucker Montresor; Josias Rowley; Thomas Fremantle; Vittorio Amedeo Sallier della Torre; Joachim Murat; Michele Carrascosa; Ruggero Settimo; Diego Naselli; Vito Nunziante	Eugène de Beauharnais; Pierre Dominique Garnier; Paul Grenier; Jean-Antoine Verdier; Jean-Mathieu Seras; Pierre-Louis Binet de Marcognet; Maurizio Ignazio Fresia; Achille Fontanelli; Domenico Pino; Filippo Severoli; Giuseppe Federico Palombini; Teodoro Lechi; Alessandro Gifflenga

Strength
50,000 Austrian soldiers (1813); 30,000 Neapolitan soldiers (since 1814)	100,000 soldiers in total (summer 1813); 46,000 Franco-Italian soldiers (since 1814)

Casualties and losses
Thousands of dead, wounded and captured	Thousands of dead, wounded and captured

The Italian campaign of 1813–1814 was a series of military operations fought during the War of the Sixth Coalition, primarily in Northern Italy, between the Franco-Italian forces and those of the anti-French Coalition, represented in this theatre chiefly by the Austrian and British armies. Following the Italian campaign of 1796–1797, it marked the end of the so-called French period in Italy and was the last occasion on which French and Austrian armies fought for control of the Italian Peninsula.

After the disastrous Russian campaign, the army of the Kingdom of Italy had been severely weakened. Although its surviving troops performed well during the German campaign of 1813, Austria's entry into the war in August left the Kingdom of Italy with no choice but to rebuild its army almost from scratch. The Franco-Italian army was commanded by the Viceroy of Italy, Eugène de Beauharnais, Napoleon's stepson, while the Coalition forces in the Italian theatre were successively led by the Austrian field marshals Johann von Hiller and Heinrich von Bellegarde, together with the British general Lord William Bentinck. Austria and Britain were also supported by the Kingdom of Sicily under Ferdinand III and the Kingdom of Sardinia under Victor Emmanuel I of Sardinia, although both states made only a limited military contribution to the campaign.

The Franco-Italians initially succeeded in slowing the Coalition advance through the Illyrian Provinces, but by early October they had been forced to withdraw to the Isonzo River, the eastern frontier of the Kingdom of Italy. In mid-October, the Coalition invasion of the kingdom began. Their numerical inferiority was further compounded by the defection of the Kingdom of Bavaria under Maximilian I Joseph of Bavaria and, more significantly, the Kingdom of Naples under Joachim Murat.

Overall, the campaign was characterised by relatively few major engagements, most notably the Battle of Caldiero and the Battle of the Mincio, interspersed with long periods of relative inactivity marked by minor clashes and diplomatic negotiations between the opposing sides. The campaign ended with the Convention of Mantua, signed by Eugène on 23 April 1814, after which he went into exile in Bavaria, where he spent the remainder of his life. The surrender resulted not from the military situation in Italy, despite the Franco-Italian defeats at San Maurizio and along the Taro River, but from Napoleon's abdication and France's subsequent capitulation to the Coalition, whose armies had occupied Paris following the exhausting campaign in north-eastern France.

== Historical context ==
=== Italy in the Napoleonic era ===
Italy in 1810, showing its political and territorial organisation at the time of the Coalition invasion of 1813–1814

From the early stages of the French Revolutionary Wars, Italy became the scene of numerous clashes between French, republican, and later imperial forces and the armies of the various coalitions. In particular, Napoleon Bonaparte's Italian campaign of 1796–1797 brought about major changes to the political map of the peninsula: the Republic of Venice ceased to exist, being incorporated into the Austrian sphere of control, while most of the Po Valley was divided among sister republics allied with and dependent on France. Soon afterwards, the continental territories of the Kingdom of Sardinia were also absorbed into France.

Napoleon's rise to power as Emperor of the French further heightened political tensions in Europe, leading to a second series of wars. In 1805, the emperor sent Marshal André Masséna to conduct a campaign in Italy against the Austrian forces of Archduke Charles. Four years later, the same task was entrusted to Prince Eugène de Beauharnais, in his first real experience as a commander, who faced the armies of Archduke John. The victories at Austerlitz and Wagram led to a further expansion of France and of the Kingdom of Italy, which had meanwhile replaced the Italian Republic, itself the successor of the Cisalpine Republic, at the expense of Austria. Under the Treaty of Pressburg, most of Veneto and Friuli were transferred to the Kingdom of Italy, while under the Treaty of Schönbrunn Dalmatia was annexed directly to the Napoleonic Empire.

Central and southern Italy also underwent profound changes. Tuscany and Lazio, like Piedmont, were incorporated into France while the southern part of the peninsula, following an invasion in 1806, was conquered by Marshal Masséna, who expelled the ruling Bourbon dynasty. The throne of the Kingdom of Naples was first granted to Napoleon's brother Joseph Bonaparte, and later, after his departure for Spain, to Marshal Joachim Murat.

By this point, mainland Italy was entirely under Bonaparte's control. By contrast, the islands of Sardinia and Sicily were never affected by the transformations that had reshaped the rest of Europe, remaining under the rule of the House of Savoy and the Bourbons respectively.

=== Background ===
In 1812, following Russia's violations of the continental blockade, the Grande Armée advanced into the Russian Empire with the aim of defeating the Imperial Russian Army and forcibly reimposing the anti-British economic system that France had required its allied states to adopt. Despite initial limited successes, Napoleon was never able to bring the Russian forces to a decisive pitched battle. The repeated withdrawals of the forces under Kutuzov drew the French army ever deeper into the country, where, in early November, it was forced to face the severe cold of the Russian winter under unprepared conditions. Forced into a long retreat and harassed by Russian forces, Napoleon's troops barely managed to cross the Berezina River and reach relative safety in Polish territory. The losses suffered during the campaign were immense: of the approximately 600.000 soldiers who had set out, fewer than one in ten are estimated to have returned.

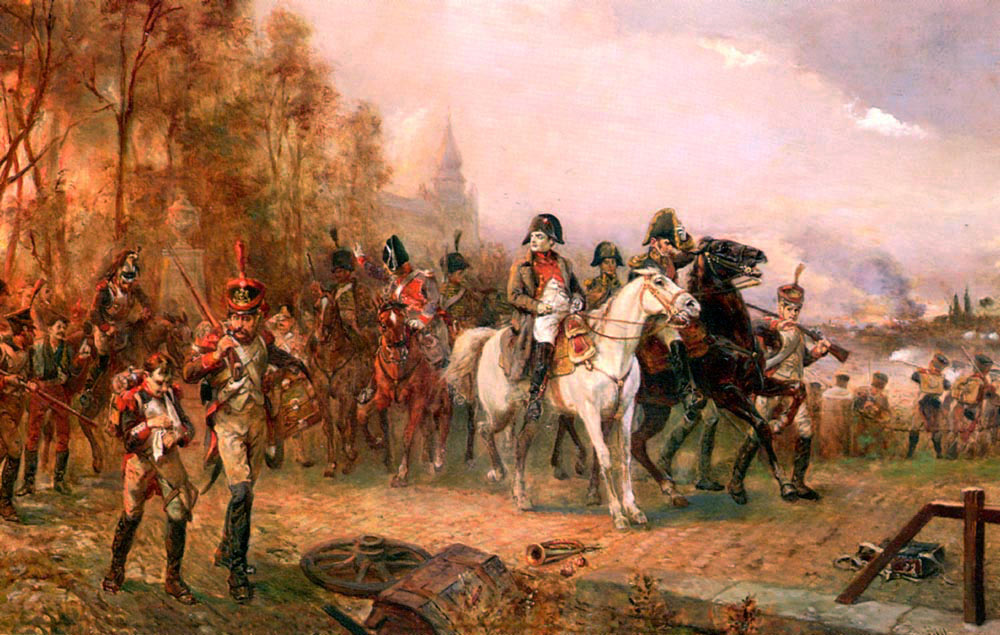
Napoleon at the Battle of Borodino

Sensing French weakness, the other European powers did not hesitate to attack Napoleon at a moment of extreme vulnerability. Only the Austrian Empire remained temporarily neutral. Austria's neutrality was largely a matter of expediency: both Chancellor Metternich and Emperor Francis harboured hostility towards Napoleon and sought an opportunity to weaken France, but, mindful of the experience of the previous wars, they chose to wait and observe the course of events in order to secure the most advantageous position. By remaining outside the conflict, Austria could act as mediator and ultimately align itself with the most favourable side at the appropriate moment.

Despite initial difficulties, particularly the shortage of veterans and the inexperience of new recruits, Napoleon managed to transform what had appeared to be an inevitable defeat into a strategic stalemate. Following the battles of Lützen and Bautzen, Austrian diplomats succeeded in securing a ceasefire between the opposing sides, which was then formalised as an armistice two days later, on 4 June 1813. Their hope — or more precisely, Metternich's — was that the French emperor would recognise his inability to achieve final victory and agree to a peace settlement, even from an unfavourable position, in order to preserve his empire. It soon became clear that Napoleon would not accept the conditions imposed by the Coalition powers, which he had repeatedly defeated over the years. Moreover, it was increasingly evident that Austria, should negotiations fail, was inclined to enter the war against its historic enemy and to avenge the humiliating defeats suffered in the previous two wars.

== Forces involved ==
=== Kingdom of Italy Army ===
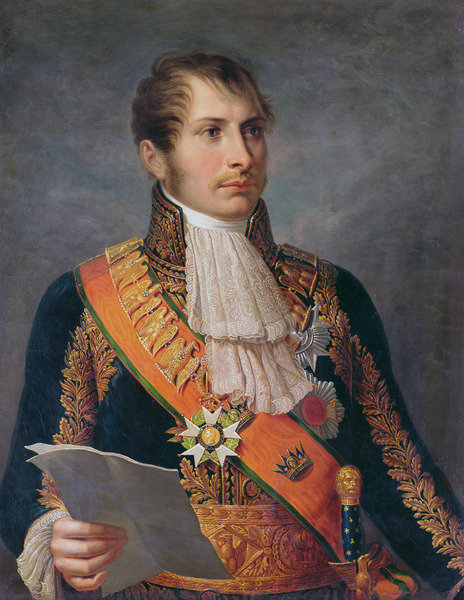
Eugène de Beauharnais, Viceroy of Italy

In anticipation of Austria's entry into the war, Napoleon—still holding the title of King of Italy—sent his stepson, Viceroy Eugène de Beauharnais, to the kingdom to organize its defence and mobilise its remaining forces. Eugène had briefly assumed command of the Grande Armée in Napoleon's absence during late 1812, and had remained with the main French forces in Germany. He returned to Italy in May 1813, arriving in Milan on 18 May, where he immediately called the available troops to arms. The response was limited: most of the kingdom's trained forces had been deployed to Russia, where they had suffered catastrophic losses during the retreat of 1812. The collapse of that campaign had effectively destroyed much of the officer corps and veteran infantry upon which the army depended. Eugène therefore faced the task of rebuilding the army almost from scratch. Napoleon had initially called for a force of around 80,000 men, combining veterans, new conscripts, and units recalled from Spain. This target proved unrealistic, but Eugène managed to assemble approximately 45,000 men, along with cavalry and artillery, over the following months.

The army was then divided into three main corps, respectively under the command of Generals Paul Grenier, Jean-Antoine Verdier and Domenico Pino, and a small reserve, under the Italian General Antonio Bonfanti. The army's three main corps moved toward the Illyrian Provinces, with headquarters established in Udine in early August. Eugène's objective was to block the two main access routes to the northern Italian plains, the Camporosso Pass and the Isonzo valley. The reserve later moved to Trentino, aiming to protect the rear from a possible Austrian attack and prevent the entire Franco-Italian army from being encircled.

=== Austrian Army ===
Austria began preparing for war even before the formal end of the armistice. By mid-1813, Vienna had effectively committed to joining the Sixth Coalition, and coordinated planning with Prussian and Russian command structures was already underway. Two main Austrian field armies were formed: one under Karl Philipp Schwarzenberg for operations in Germany, and a second, the Army of Inner Austria, assigned to the Italian theatre under Johann von Hiller.

Hiller assembled a force of roughly 50,000 men in Styria, supported by a corps structure drawn from Austrian, Hungarian, Croatian, and Galician troops. These units were distributed across staging areas along the Habsburg frontier in preparation for the campaign into northern Italy. By mid-August 1813, Austrian forces assigned to the Italian front numbered slightly over 40,000 men, with additional reinforcements in reserve. The army was organised into several divisions positioned across Carinthia and Inner Austria, covering the main Alpine passes and access routes into the Venetian plain.

=== Anglo-Sicilian forces ===
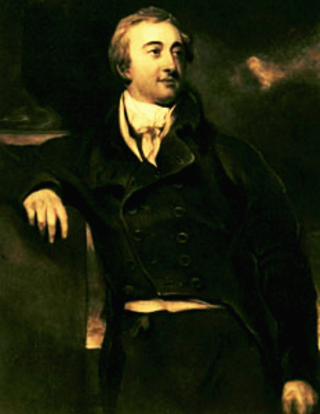
Lord William Bentinck

After the French invasion of Naples in 1806, the Bourbon court retreated to Sicily under British protection. The island became a key strategic position for control of the central Mediterranean, with the Royal Navy maintaining a permanent presence to prevent French expansion. Over time, British influence over Sicilian defence and administration increased significantly, particularly under Lord William Bentinck, who arrived in 1811. Alongside political reforms, he also assumed responsibility for coordinating military forces on the island.

The Sicilian army itself remained weak and poorly trained, numbering only a few thousand effective troops. British forces provided the main defensive capability, typically ranging between 7,000 and 17,000 men depending on deployments to other theatres. By 1813, combined Anglo-Sicilian forces available for operations in Italy numbered approximately 14,000 men, including locally recruited Italian units organised under British supervision. British naval forces operating in the Adriatic further supported operations, maintaining pressure on French and Italian coastal communications and gradually reducing French naval presence in the region.

=== Neapolitan Army ===
The Kingdom of Naples retained a significant military force under Joachim Murat, who had served extensively in the Napoleonic wars but increasingly pursued an independent political agenda in Italy. Although Murat claimed to possess a large army, only part of his forces were immediately available for field operations, with many units assigned to garrison duties across southern Italy. The active field army consisted of several infantry divisions, supported by cavalry, artillery, and a royal guard.

In practice, Murat could mobilise roughly 30,000 men for rapid operations. However, political calculations and tensions with Eugène prevented effective coordination between the Neapolitan and Franco-Italian forces. The decision to join the Allied forces further weakened the Neapolitan army, as most of the most experienced and efficient officers were French and preferred to leave Italy rather than fight against their own country.

== The campaign ==
=== Napoleonic offensives in the Illyrian Provinces and Tyrol ===
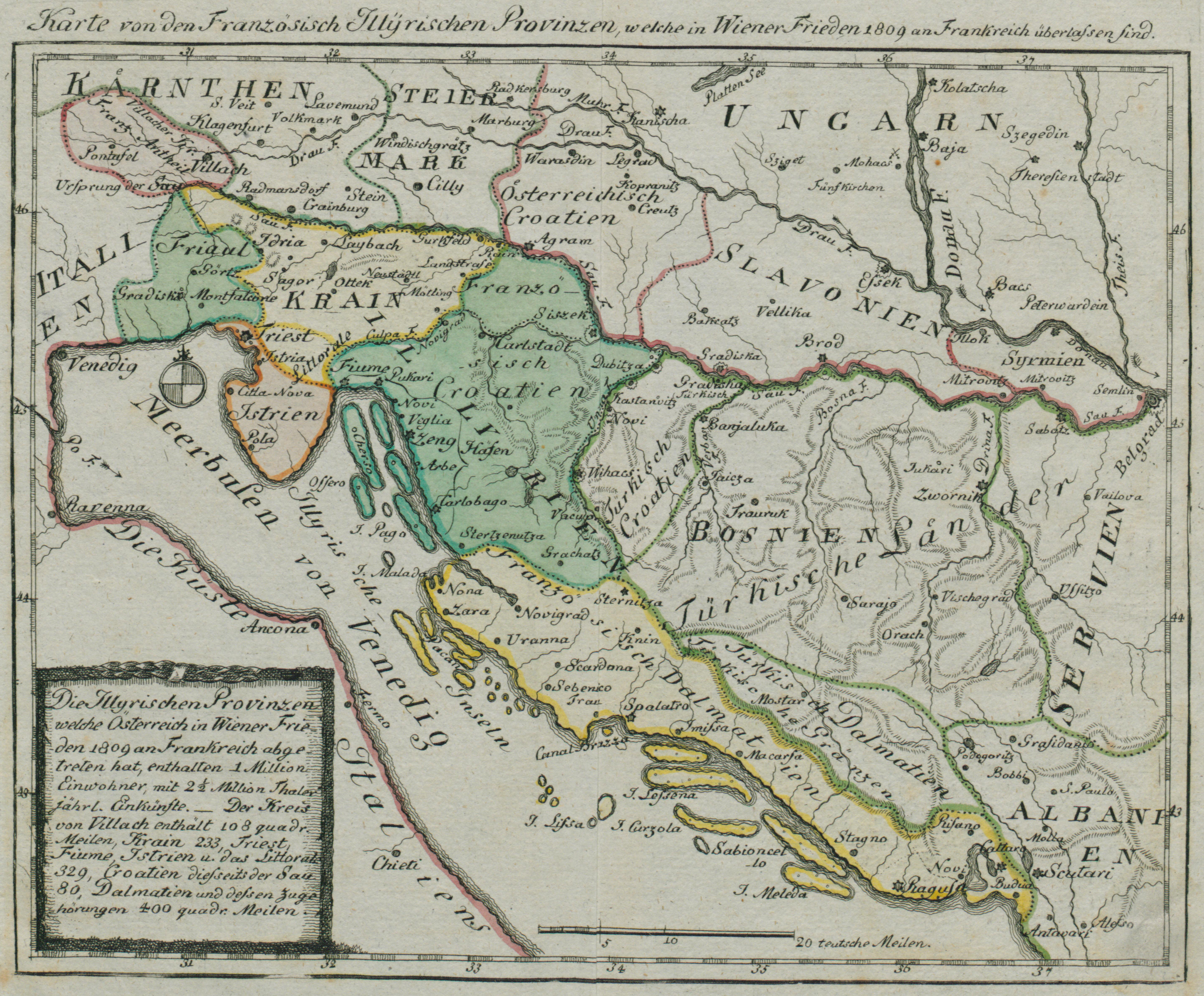
1813 map of the Illyrian Provinces

Hostilities resumed on 17 August 1813 with the expiration of the Armistice of Pleiswitz. Having received confirmation of the renewal of war before Eugène, Johann von Hiller resolved to secure Austria's southern flank before advancing into Italy. Uncertain of the Franco-Italian army's dispositions, he sought to prevent Eugène from crossing the Alpine passes and threatening the Coalition armies operating in Austria and Bohemia. At the same time, he hoped to encourage anti-French uprisings throughout the Illyrian Provinces, where French rule remained unpopular. To achieve these objectives, Hiller concentrated the divisions of Sommariva, Frimont, and Marziani around Klagenfurt, while Marchal and Radivojevich covered the approaches from Styria and Croatia. The arrival of Austrian troops immediately triggered local revolts, and many Croatian units deserted the Napoleonic army to join the Imperial forces, increasing Hiller's strength to roughly 60,000 men.

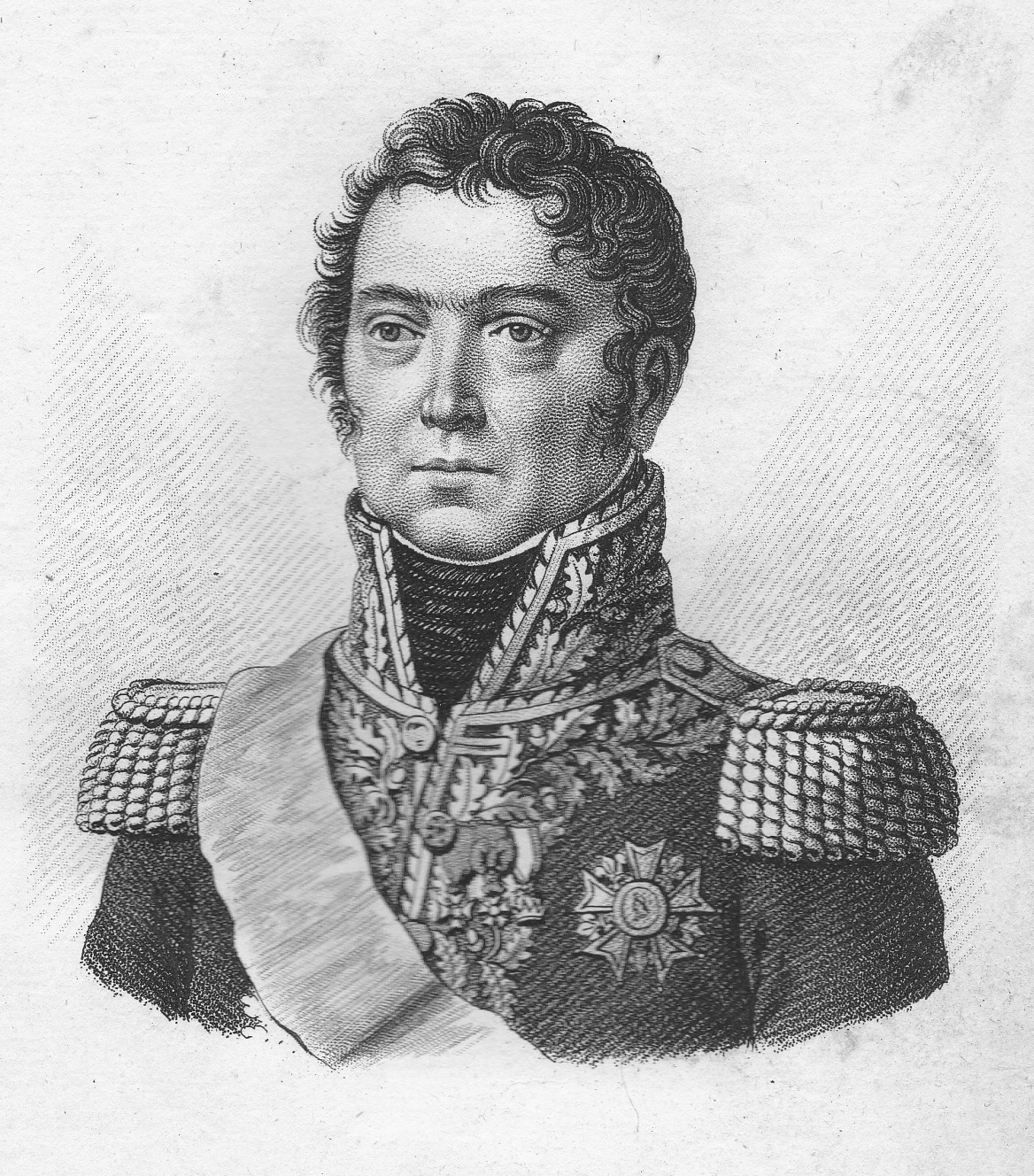
General Paul Grenier

Eugène, informed of the Austrian offensive one day later, responded by dispatching Paul Grenier's corps towards Villach, while Palombini advanced on Ljubljana and other Franco-Italian forces concentrated around Tarvisio. Around 21 August, Austrian troops crossed the Drava River between Rosegg and Villach, occupying both localities. Grenier quickly counterattacked, forcing the Austrians to withdraw across the river by the end of the month. Attempting to regain the initiative, Eugène ordered Grenier to continue the advance. The opposing forces met at the Battle of Feistritz, where the Franco-Italian army won a tactical victory on 6 September, inflicting significantly heavier losses on the Austrians than it suffered itself. Two days later, however, General Gaspare Bellotti was surprised, defeated and captured at Kaplja Vas, partially offsetting the success at Feistritz.

Meanwhile, operations also developed in Istria and Carniola. General Pierre Dominique Garnier evacuated Fiume on 26 August, allowing Laval Nugent to occupy the city the following day. In early September, Pino advanced eastwards but hesitated after receiving inaccurate intelligence regarding Austrian movements. On 7 September he sent forward Ruggeri's brigade, which was intercepted and defeated by Nugent at the Battle of Lippa. The Austrian success enabled Nugent to reoccupy most of Istria and impose a blockade on the important port of Trieste. Nevertheless, Eugène continued his offensive and reached Ljubljana on 11 September. Learning of the setback, he detached Palombini and Pino towards the Adriatic coast while personally advancing against Radivojevich to prevent Austrian reinforcements from reaching Istria. The two Italian generals defeated Nugent at the Battle of Jelschane on 14 September and recaptured Fiume the following day. Shortly afterwards, Pino officially relinquished command of his division on grounds of ill health, transferring it to Palombini. (Note: Although Pino's resignation was officially attributed to health reasons, several historians argue that he was in fact removed after disappointing Eugène, who considered him overly cautious during the operations in Istria. The episode permanently damaged the relationship between the two men, and during the political crisis of April 1814 Pino openly opposed Eugène's attempt to retain power in the Kingdom of Italy.) At the same time, fighting continued in central Carniola, where both armies contested control of the strategically important town of Ivančna Gorica.

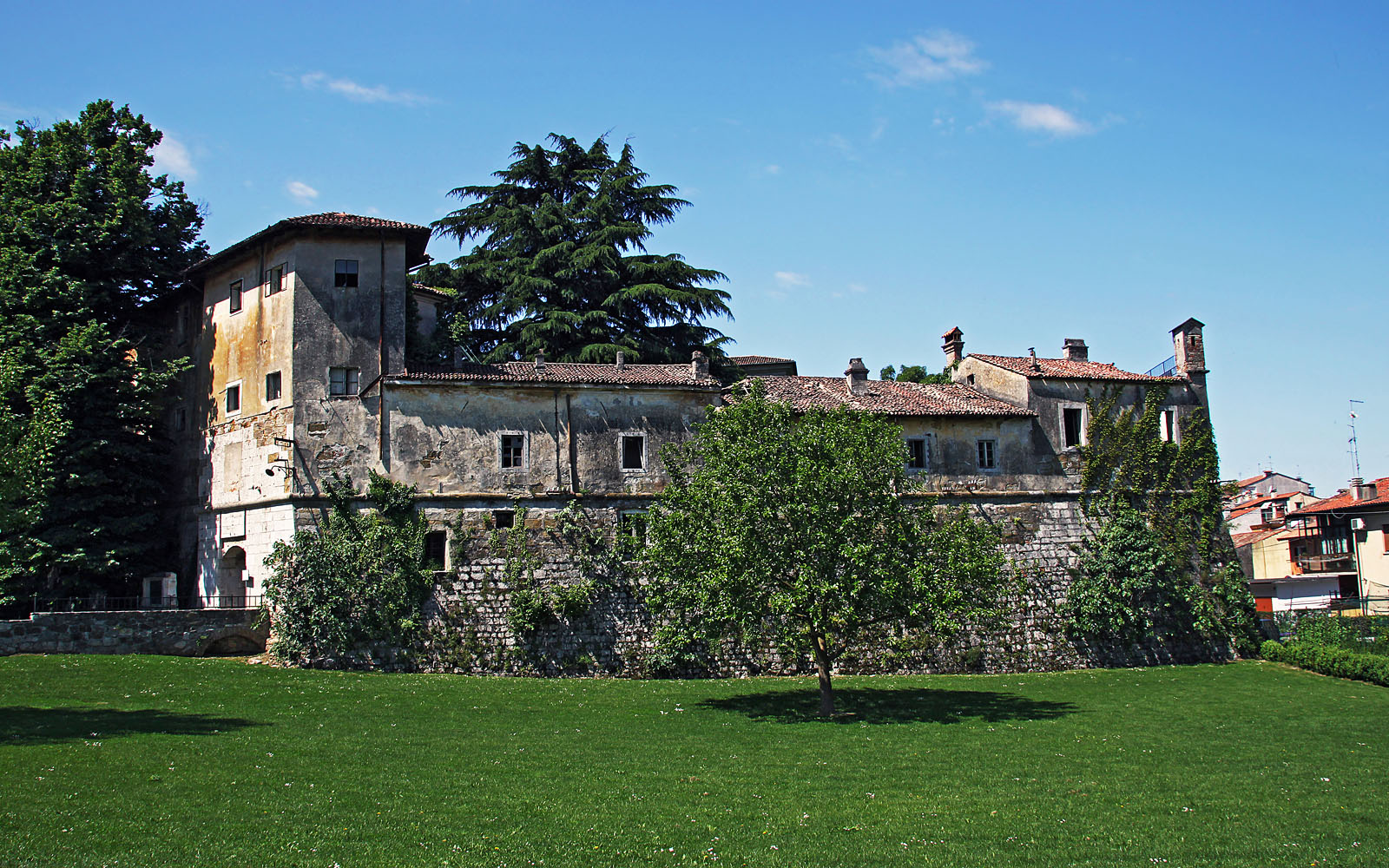
Gradisca Fortress

Eugène's early successes proved short-lived. On 18 September, part of Verdier's division was defeated at Sankt Hermagor by Frimont's troops and forced to abandon its position. The setback led to the evacuation of Villach and, within days, to a general withdrawal toward Tarvisio. The Austrian victory secured Hiller's control of the Loibl Pass, restoring his communications and placing Eugène in an increasingly precarious position. After Hiller crossed the upper Sava near Kranj, the viceroy abandoned Ljubljana and fell back to the Isonzo valley. The French right wing also encountered growing difficulties. Following the recapture of Rijeka, the Austrian forces in Istria avoided an immediate engagement with Palombini, who had withdrawn to Cerknica. Radivojevich then concentrated his troops and defeated Palombini at the Battle of Cerknica on 27 September. Unable to hold his positions, Eugène ordered a general retreat to the Isonzo. Trieste was evacuated, except for its garrison, while the French-Italian army concentrated around Gradisca and Gorizia. By 6 October, the withdrawal had been completed.

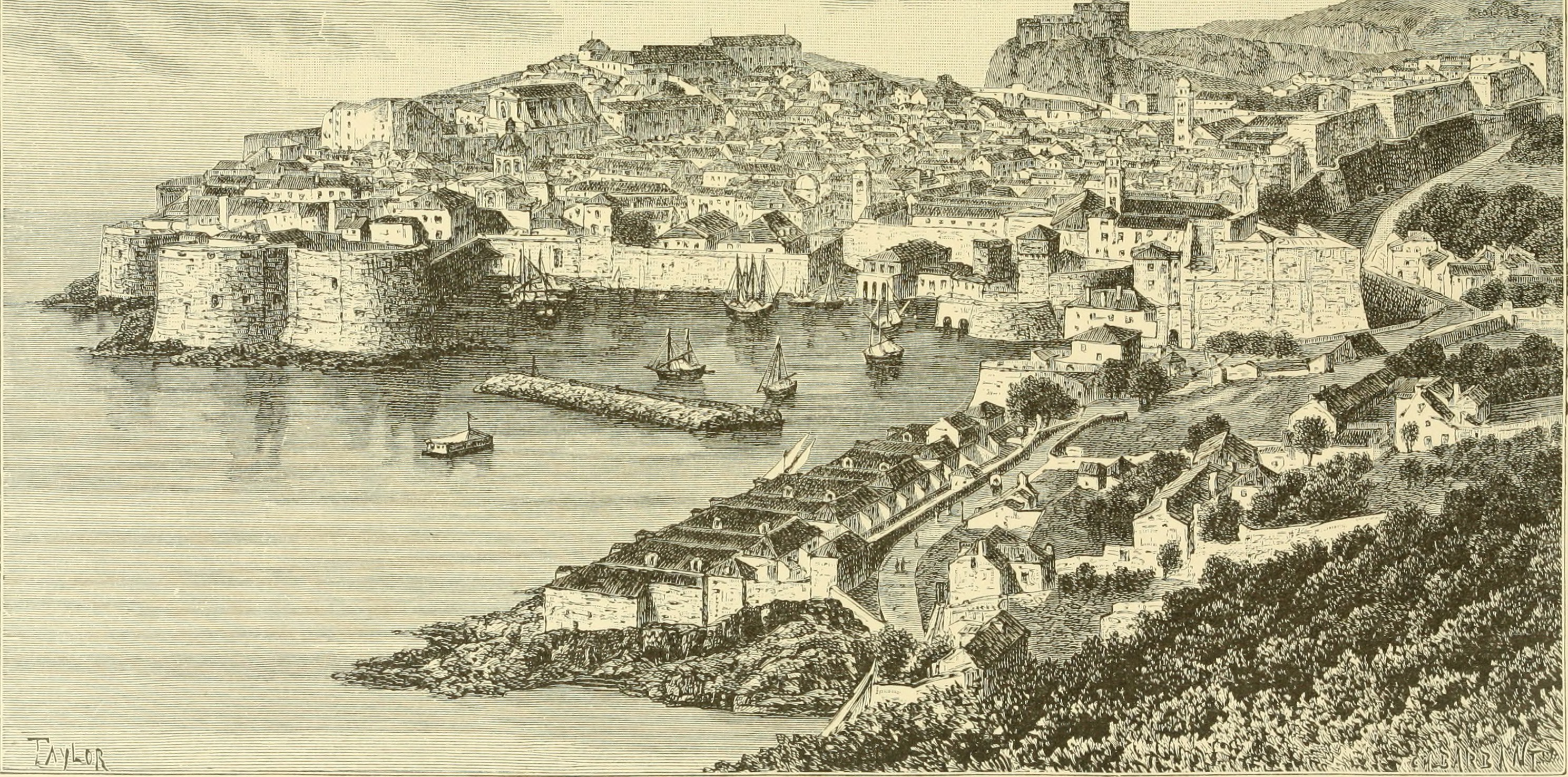
Dubrovnik in the nineteenth century

At the same time, Austrian operations continued along the Adriatic coast against the remaining French-held ports. A detached corps under General Franjo Tomašić advanced through Dalmatia with little opposition. French forces withdrew into the principal coastal fortresses, where they were besieged by Austrian troops on land and the Royal Navy at sea. During the following months, the French strongholds fell one after another. Zadar capitulated on 6 December 1813 after a prolonged siege. Cattaro surrendered on 3 January 1814 after a joint British-Montenegrin siege, while Dubrovnik fell on 29 January following attacks by Austrian and British forces. The capture of Dubrovnik effectively ended French rule along the Illyrian coast.

On the French left, Bonfanti advanced into Tyrol, reaching Trento by mid-September while detachments occupied Brixen and Mühlbachl. Facing only local Austrian volunteer forces, he nevertheless adopted an unexpectedly cautious strategy and began withdrawing toward Verona. After briefly returning to Trento, he was relieved of command and replaced by General Alessandro Gifflenga, one of Eugène's aides-de-camp. Gifflenga pursued a more aggressive policy, advancing as far as Mühlbachl and defeating Austrian detachments in engagements on 28 September and 7 October. His advance ended when he learned that an Austrian column under General Fenner was approaching with substantial reinforcements. He withdrew toward Trento, but after the Austrians reached the city and besieged its French garrison on 15 October, Gifflenga was forced to continue his retreat toward Volano and Rovereto.

=== The Napoleonic retreat ===
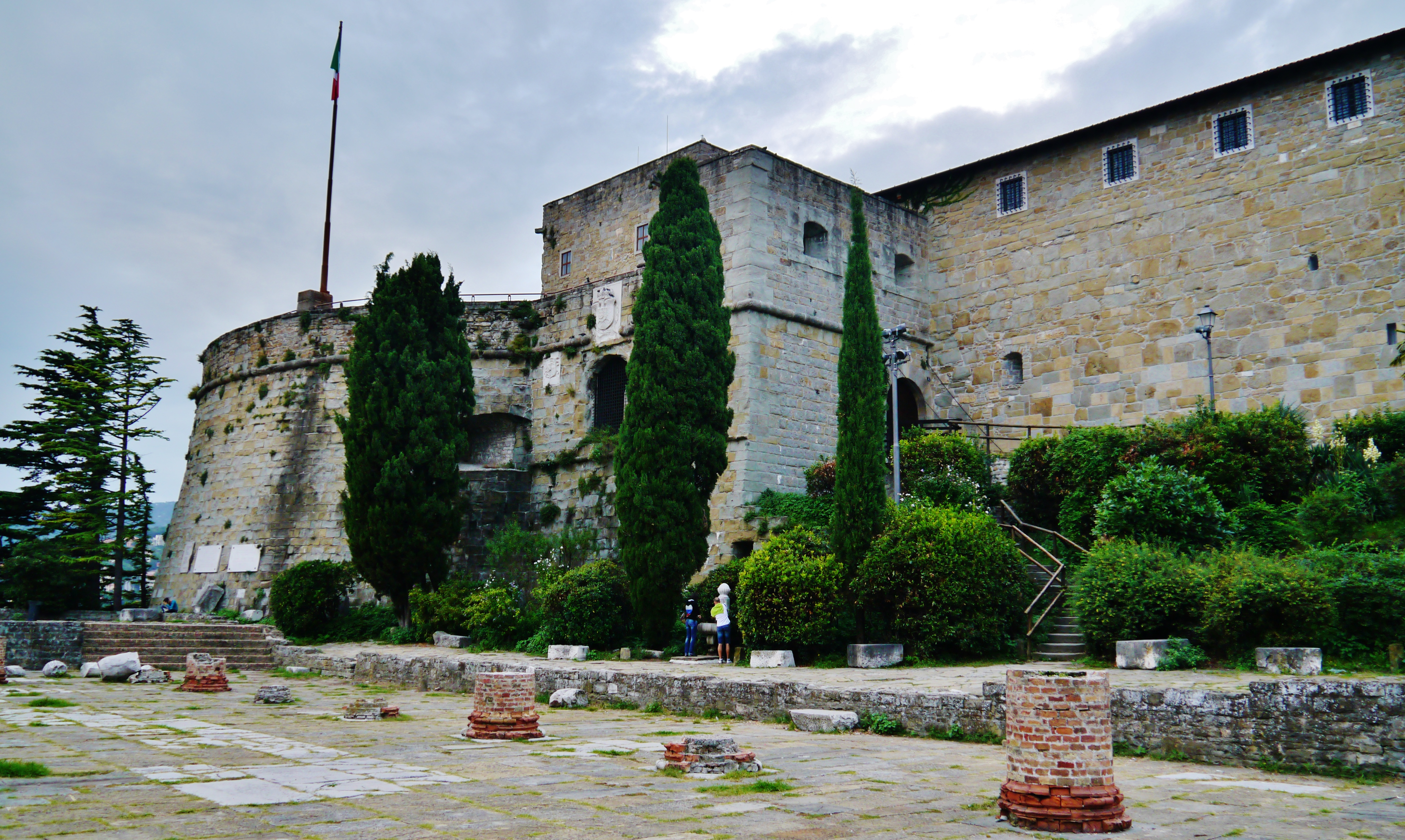
Castle of San Giusto in Trieste

With his rear threatened by the Austrian advance through the Tyrol, Eugène was forced to reorganize his army to avoid being outflanked and trapped in Friuli. The evacuation of Slovenia and Istria began on 27 September, and by 6 October the Franco-Italian army had withdrawn behind the Isonzo. Only the garrison of Trieste, commanded by General Fresia, remained behind. The city was besieged on 13 October, and after sixteen days of resistance Colonel Rabié surrendered the Castle of San Giusto to Nugent.

Further north, Grenier commanded the troops assembled around Tarvisio. During the retreat his forces encountered three Austrian battalions at Camporosso, which Hiller had detached to harass the withdrawal. Grenier's troops repulsed the attack and continued their retreat in good order through the Fella valley, reaching the Friulian plain between Gemona, Ospedaletto and Venzone. Apart from a minor action on 13 October, no significant engagements took place during this phase of the retreat.

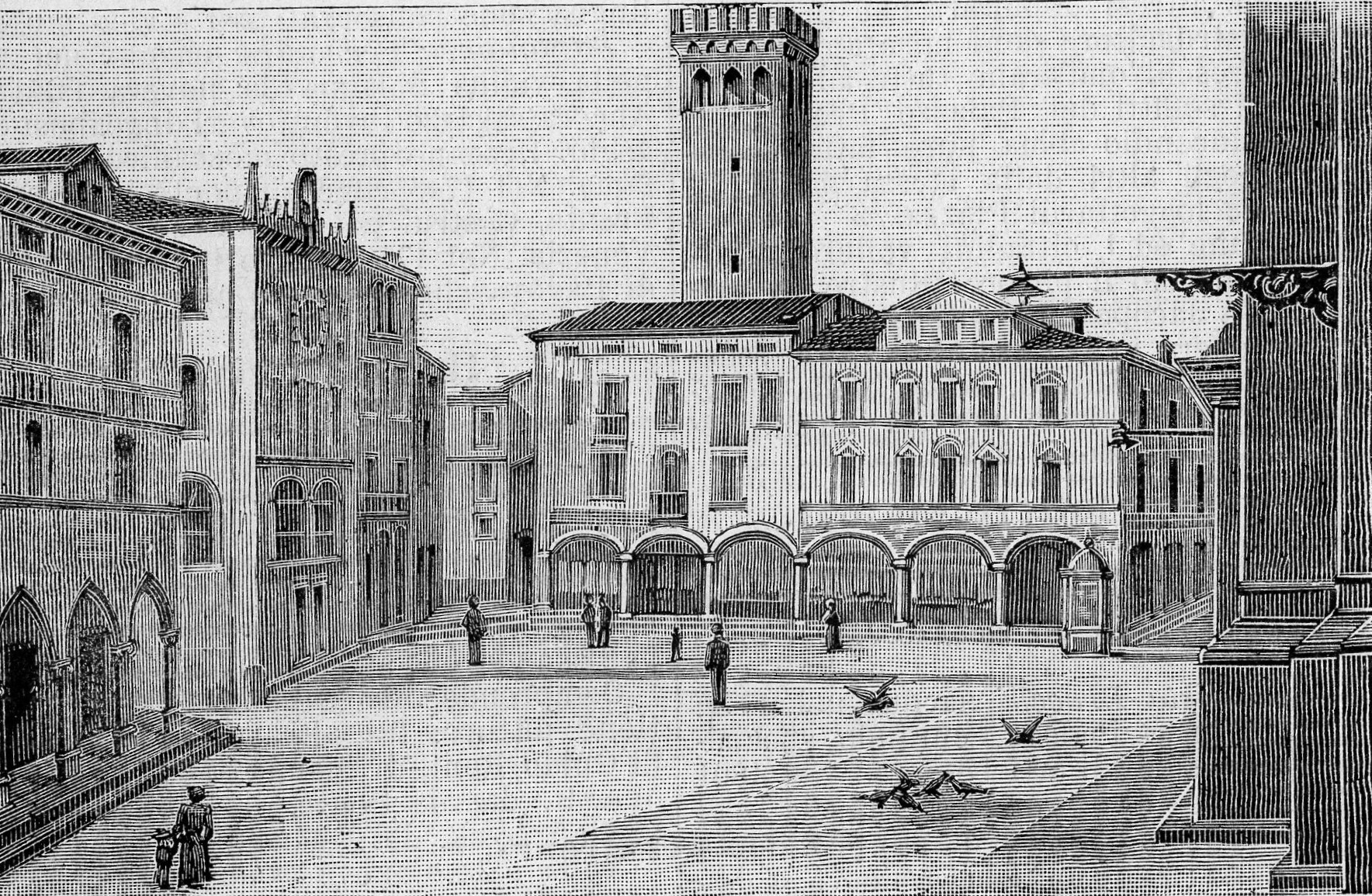
Xilography of Bassano del Grappa, 1901

Meanwhile, Eugène established his headquarters at Gradisca and took steps to strengthen his position. He ordered the conscription of 15,000 men, accelerated the formation of a new division at Verona, and reinforced the garrisons of Palmanova and Venice. Shortly afterwards the army began a staged withdrawal toward the Veneto, initially intending to defend the line of the Piave. (Note: Albert Weil observes that both Napoleon and Eugène would have preferred to make a stand along the Piave, which they considered a stronger defensive line for the Kingdom of Italy. The Austrian advance through the Tyrol and the risk of being outflanked, however, forced the viceroy to continue his retreat to the Adige.) Palombini was ordered to divide his command, withdrawing one division behind Conegliano while holding the other at Codroipo to cover Grenier's movements. Grenier, in turn, was instructed to retire through Belluno and Feltre while delaying Hiller's advance, allowing the rest of the army to fall back toward Verona. By 30 October the Franco-Italian forces had successfully crossed the Piave, and Eugène established a new headquarters at Spresiano.

Meanwhile, on 24 October Radivojevich's Austrian corps entered the Kingdom of Italy in two columns, advancing between the Alps and the Adriatic coast. Three days later General Eckhardt descended through the Piave valley and reached Bassano ahead of the Franco-Italian army. At the same time, Austrian forces advancing through the Tyrol occupied Trento before pushing south along the Adige and Brenta valleys in an attempt to outflank Eugène's retreat. On 26 October Gifflenga's troops were attacked at Serrada and Volano. Although they initially resisted, they were eventually forced to abandon their positions by Vlašić's division. After another engagement at San Marco on 28 October, Gifflenga withdrew toward Rivoli and Ferrara di Monte Baldo, where Palombini's division arrived to support any further retreat.

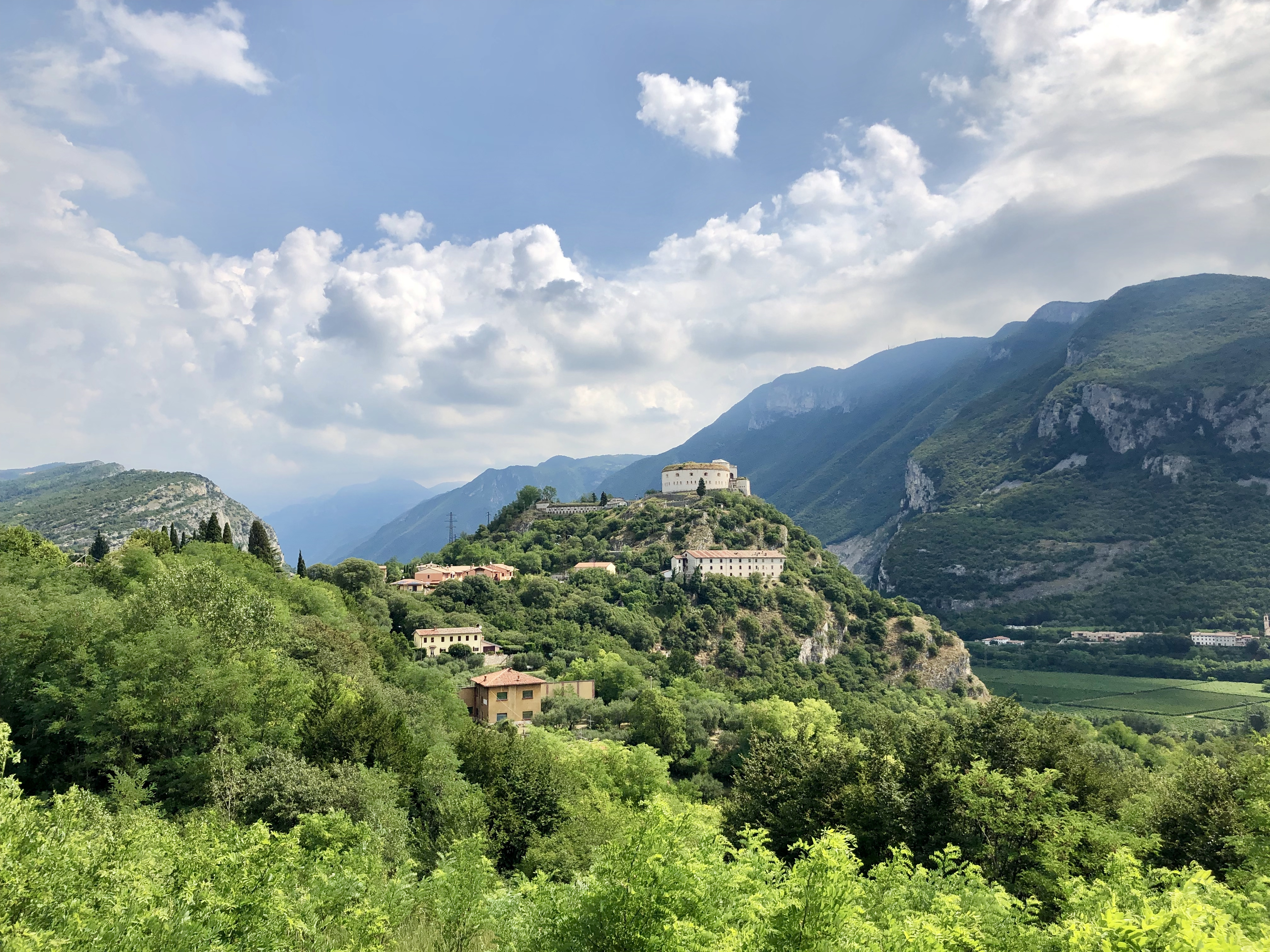
Forte Rivoli

Palombini's withdrawal left Bassano exposed, forcing Grenier to fall back. Eckhardt briefly seized Casoni and disrupted Franco-Italian communications before Grenier counterattacked and recaptured the village. Despite renewed Austrian assaults, the position remained in Franco-Italian hands. On the evening of 30 October Eugène reached Rossano and ordered Grenier to retake Bassano, whose occupation threatened the army's line of retreat. Advancing in three columns on 31 October, Grenier's corps routed the Austrian defenders and drove them out of the town. The victory secured the army's withdrawal, but with Austrian forces already established on the Tagliamento, Eugène abandoned the Piave and decided to make his stand on the Adige. His headquarters were transferred to Verona on 6 November.

The retreat had a significant impact on the Franco-Italian army. Desertion among recruits from territories already occupied by the Austrians, together with casualties and the troops left behind in garrisons, reduced Eugène's force from roughly 50,000 to just over 32,000 men. Concluding that Gratien's weakened division could no longer operate independently, Eugène reorganized the army on 5–6 November into two corps, commanded respectively by Grenier and Verdier, responsible for defending the lower Adige and the line between Bergamo and Brescia. The original six infantry divisions were consolidated into four, while the garrison of Venice was strengthened to about 8,000 men supported by more than 300 guns. Around the same time, Joseph Fouché, recently appointed governor of the Illyrian Provinces, reached Bologna shortly before Venice was placed under a British naval blockade.

=== The engagements in the Po Valley ===
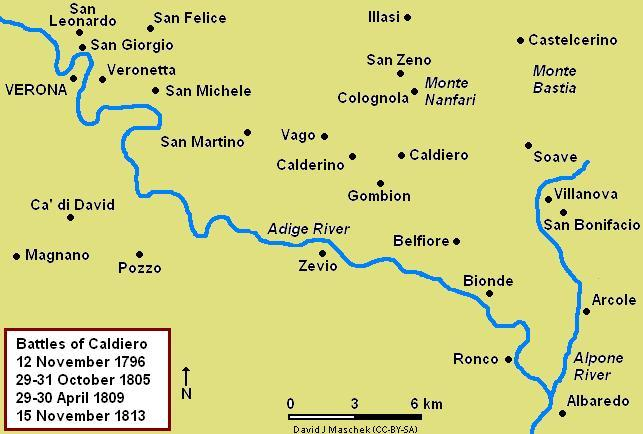
Map of the Verona region

While Eugène's forces were repositioning along the Adige, Hiller was maneuvering his troops to resume the offensive. He was stationed, with the bulk of his army, at Trento and intended to advance through the Valsugana in order to reach Bassano and Vicenza, covered by Sommariva, who was to push his men toward Rovereto.

Having learned from deserters of the position of the French troops near Chiusa di Ceraino, Vlašić began moving toward the Trompia Valley, while the remainder of the army, under Radivojevich, advanced into the Venetian plain, remaining between Castelfranco Veneto, Cittadella and Vicenza. Eckhardt acted as a link between this group and the main army directly under Hiller's command. Separate from the rest of the army remained Marchal's corps, supported by Fremantle's fleet, tasked with the siege of Venice, defended by General Seras. Further favorable news reached the Austrian Imperial forces: the division of vice-Marshal Franz Freiherr von Pflacher was en route to reinforce them, and the Aulic Council in Vienna had allocated an additional 39 battalions and 14 cavalry squadrons as reinforcements.

Eugène, unaware of Hiller's movements toward the plain, still believed that Radivojevich was "isolated." This led him to assume he held clear numerical superiority, at least temporarily, and that he could exploit it by immediately attacking the enemy in the Adige valley. On 9 November, while Gifflenga's forces were repelling Austrian detachments in the Trompia Valley, Eugène took two divisions, those of Palombini and Rouyer, and marched along both banks of the Adige toward the Austrian positions at Brentino Belluno. The two divisions, deployed in column, attacked the Austrian outposts and drove them back. The viceroy hoped to draw Hiller's attention and prevent further incursions toward Brescia.

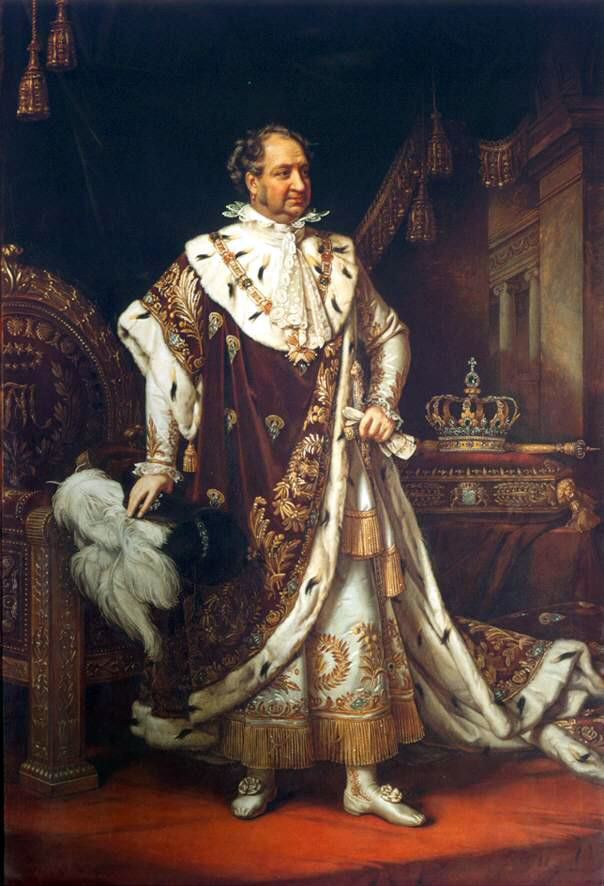
Maximilian I Joseph, King of Bavaria

Having been informed by scouts of the presence of a strong Austrian division at Caldiero, with which he engaged in a brief skirmish, Eugène withdrew his troops from the newly occupied positions and returned to Verona. Determined to attack, he completed preparations for 14 November, but torrential rain on that day forced the assault to be postponed by twenty-four hours. At seven in the morning of 15 November, the brigades of Jeanin and Deconchy, supported by Bonnemains, attacked Caldiero, defended by the Jelačić regiment. The Franco-Italian forces prevailed, and after a long engagement the exhausted Austrians eventually withdrew. Four days later, another clash took place at San Martino and San Michele. Initially, Austrian forces attacked Vago, held by Jeanin's brigade, which resisted the pressure; Marcognet, stationed at San Martino Buon Albergo, recognized the enemy movement and called in reinforcements. Overwhelmed by superior Austrian numbers, the Franco-Italians fell back to San Michele, where, despite the imbalance of forces, they managed to hold their position and eventually repelled the attackers.

After the clash at San Martino, a stalemate developed on the Adige front. On 22 November, an Austrian envoy arrived at San Michele, in French-held territory, carrying a letter to be delivered personally to the Viceroy of Italy. The messenger, in reality Prince Thurn und Taxis, aide-de-camp to King Maximilian I Joseph of Bavaria and father-in-law of Eugène, had been sent to present a peace proposal supported by Metternich. A diet of the German states assembled in Frankfurt had been convened in the aftermath of the Battle of Leipzig and had tasked the Bavarian king with offering Eugène a settlement that would detach Italy from Napoleon without further bloodshed. The letter, signed by the king himself, proposed Italian independence from France and confirmed that Murat was also negotiating with the Allies. Eugène, determined to remain loyal to his adoptive father, rejected the offer and chose to continue the armed struggle against Austria. The envoy then proceeded to Hiller, stationed at Vicenza; within days, his replacement would arrive in Italy.

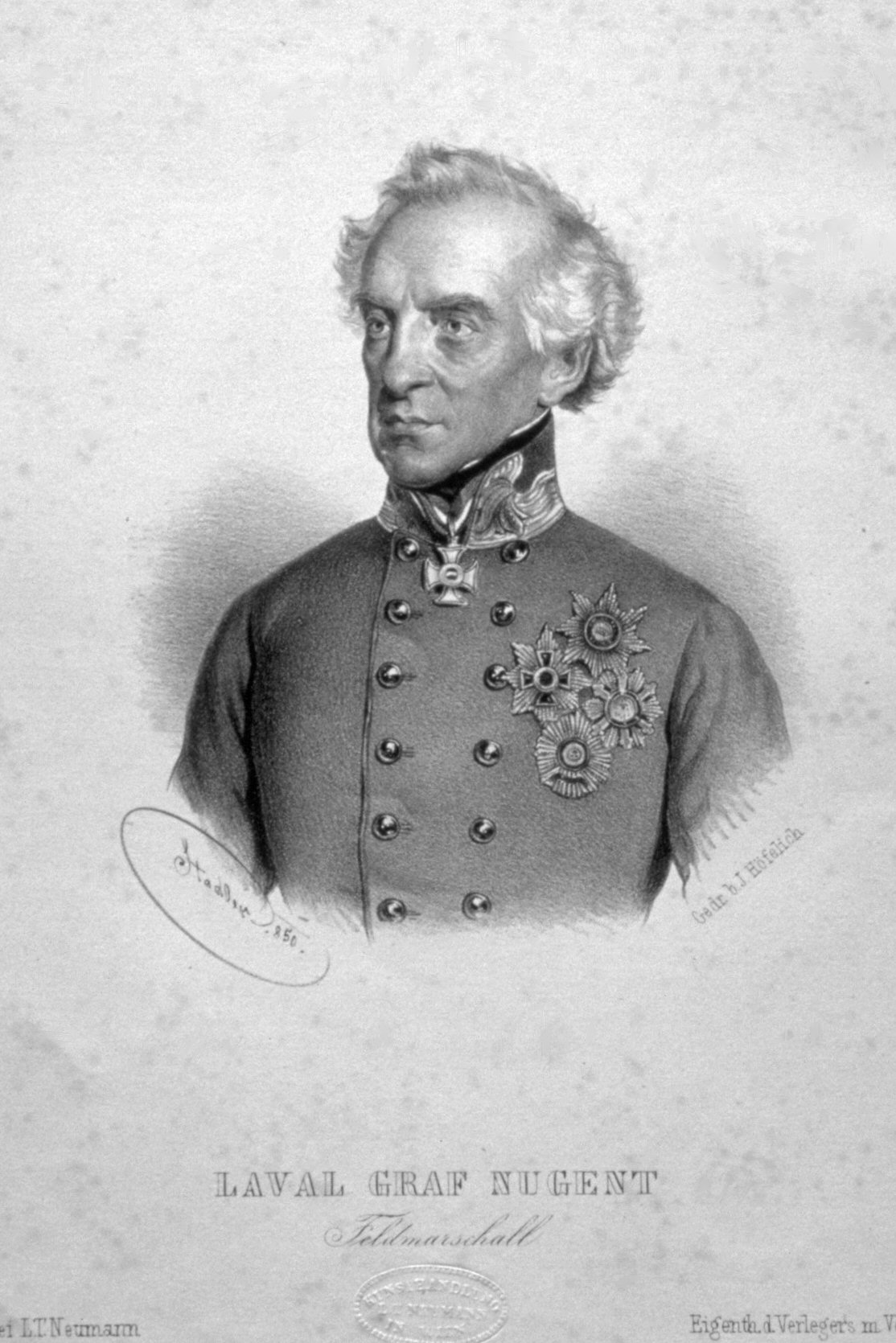
General Nugent von Westmeath in 1850

On the same day as the battle of Caldiero, an Austro-British contingent landed in Romagna. Following the conclusion of the siege of Trieste, Nugent coordinated with the British to transport his troops across the Adriatic, aiming for the mouths of the Po. To conceal the operation, rumors were spread suggesting landings at Zara or Venice, both still under French control. On 10 November, once winds were favorable, Nugent's force set sail from Trieste aboard the British ships HMS Eagle, Tremendous and Wizard, supported by three hastily armed Austrian gunboats. The expedition consisted of approximately 2,000 Austrian infantry, 73 hussars, 600 British soldiers, and twelve artillery pieces. After a difficult crossing, the flotilla reached the Romagna coast on 14 November. Coordinating with the forces of Josias Rowley, Nugent's troops landed near Goro on 15 November and in four days captured Gorino, Po di Gnocca, Comacchio, Magnavacca and Ferrara.

Eugène could not ignore this landing, which threatened the Po estuary and the French Adriatic departments. French generals Deconchy and Marcognet attempted a counteroffensive in the Polesine but were soon forced to retreat. Nugent continued his advance, occupying Ravenna on 10 December and reaching Badia Polesine the following day. A temporary success was achieved by General Pino, who briefly retook Ferrara on 26 November. In the final weeks of 1813, Austrian forces attempted to enter Lombardy through Brescia but were intercepted by Gifflenga's troops in the Val Camonica. They were defeated first at Edolo on 7 December by Colonel Neri and again at Ponte di Legno. Abandoning the attempt, the Austrians withdrew into the Val Gallinera.

Meanwhile, British and Sicilian troops attempted an unsuccessful landing in Tuscany to spark local uprisings. A first expedition of 1,500 men under the Bourbon colonel Catinelli, transported by the British fleet commanded by Rowley, landed at Viareggio on 10 December. The force briefly occupied Lucca and advanced as far as La Spezia before withdrawing. A second attempt to seize Livorno also failed, and the expedition was re-embarked on 16 December, returning to Sicily.

=== Murat's defection ===
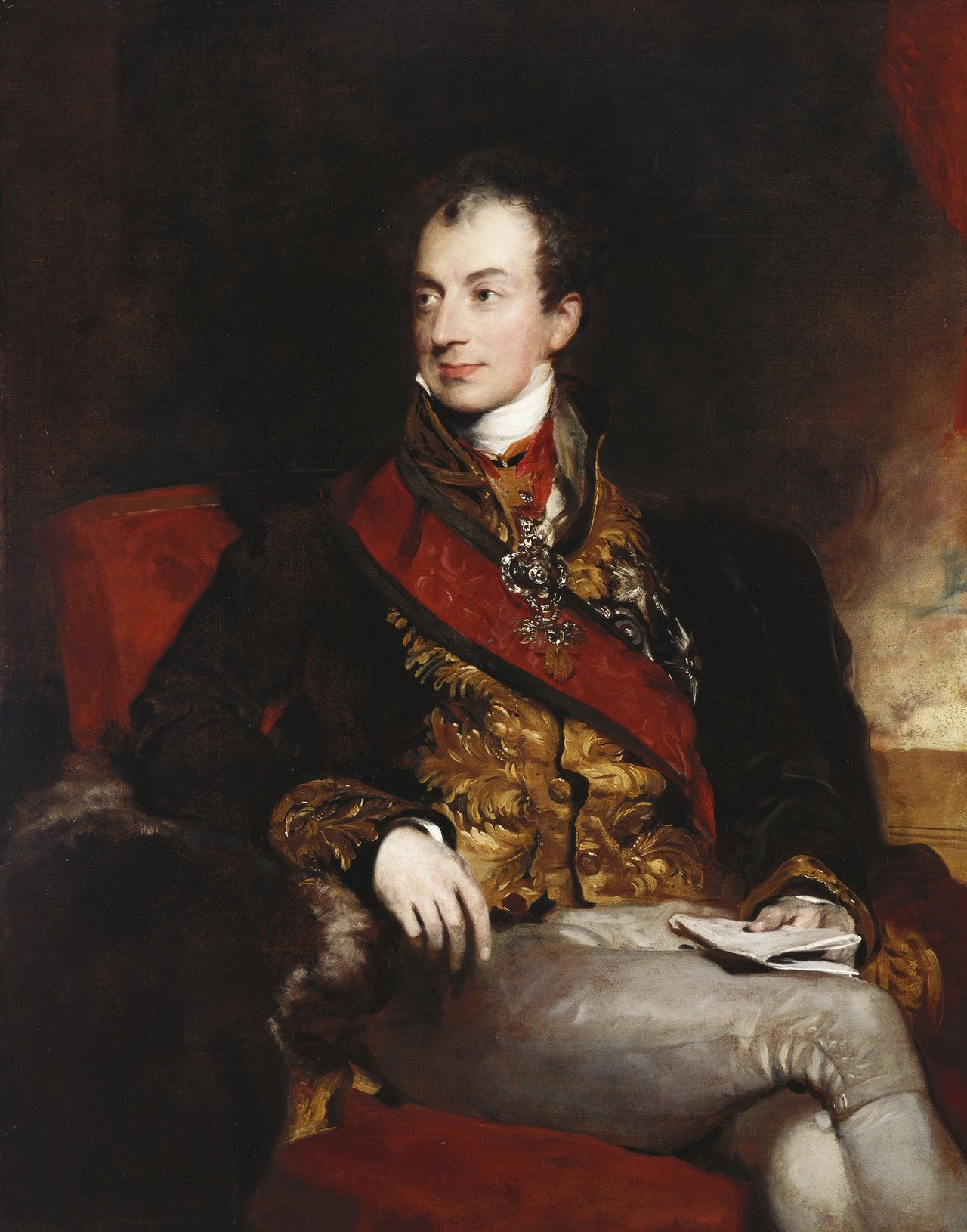
Klemens von Metternich, the Austrian Chancellor

Relations between King Joachim Murat of Naples and Emperor Napoleon had steadily deteriorated over the preceding years. Napoleon repeatedly interfered in the internal affairs of the Kingdom of Naples, forcing Murat to revise important political decisions and follow French policy. Murat, however, increasingly sought to secure an independent throne, free from French domination and, above all, from Napoleon himself. He also cultivated the ambition of unifying Italy under his own rule, an objective that appeared increasingly unattainable after the disastrous Russian campaign.

The relationship suffered a further blow after the retreat from Russia. Having briefly assumed command of the remnants of the Grande Armée in December 1812, Murat abandoned the army in early January 1813 and returned to Naples without Napoleon's approval. Napoleon reacted angrily and sought to undermine Murat's reputation by publishing an article in Le Moniteur universel praising Eugène de Beauharnais as the more capable commander of large armies. Although Murat nevertheless accepted command of the cavalry during the later stages of the German campaign of 1813, he had already begun exploring alternatives. As early as March 1813 he opened contacts with Austrian diplomats, hoping to secure international recognition for his kingdom even at the cost of abandoning claims to Sicily. At the same time, he sought British support, since the United Kingdom remained the principal protector of the Bourbon court at Palermo.

A first attempt to reach an understanding with the British took place in May, when Murat's representatives secretly travelled to the British-held island of Ponza to negotiate with William Bentinck. Bentinck's conditions, however, proved unacceptable. Murat would have been required to abdicate the Neapolitan throne in exchange for another kingdom after the war and immediately commit the Army of the Kingdom of Naples to Coalition operations in northern Italy. Hoping to obtain more favourable terms from Metternich, Murat abandoned the negotiations without reaching an agreement.

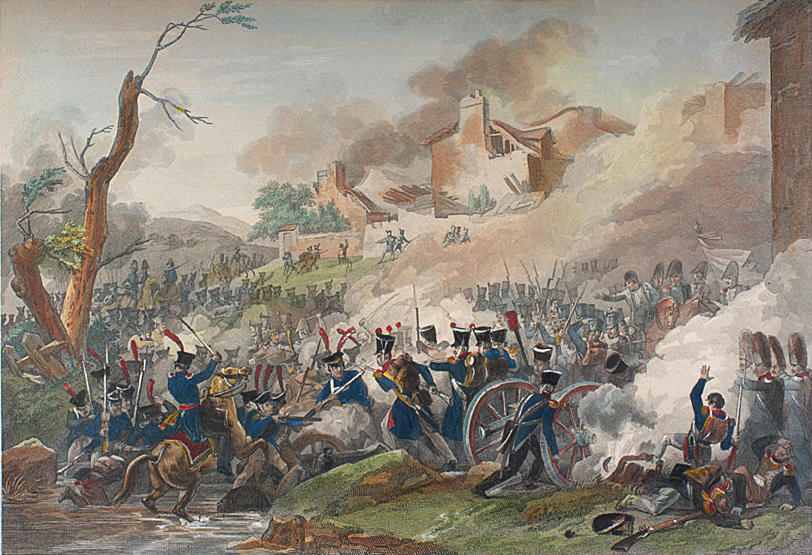
The Battle of Leipzig

Arriving at Dresden shortly before the end of the Armistice of Pläswitz, Murat became one of the strongest advocates of peace within Napoleon's entourage, reflecting the exhaustion of both his own army and the French forces as a whole. Napoleon's refusal to accept the terms proposed by Metternich ensured that the war continued. The French defeat at Leipzig convinced Murat that his ambitions could no longer be achieved while remaining loyal to Napoleon. During their final meeting, he declared that he would return to Naples to bring his army north to assist in the defence of Italy—something he had previously refused to do. By this stage, however, Murat was already maintaining close contacts with Austrian diplomacy. Although Austria and Naples remained formally at war, the Austrian envoy in Naples, Count Felix von Mier, remained at his post, while Neapolitan representatives likewise continued their activities in Vienna.

Napoleon reportedly dispatched Joseph Fouché first to Rome and later to Naples in an attempt to dissuade Murat from abandoning the French cause. Fouché's ambiguous conduct during this period, however, has led historians to question how actively he pursued the mission entrusted to him.

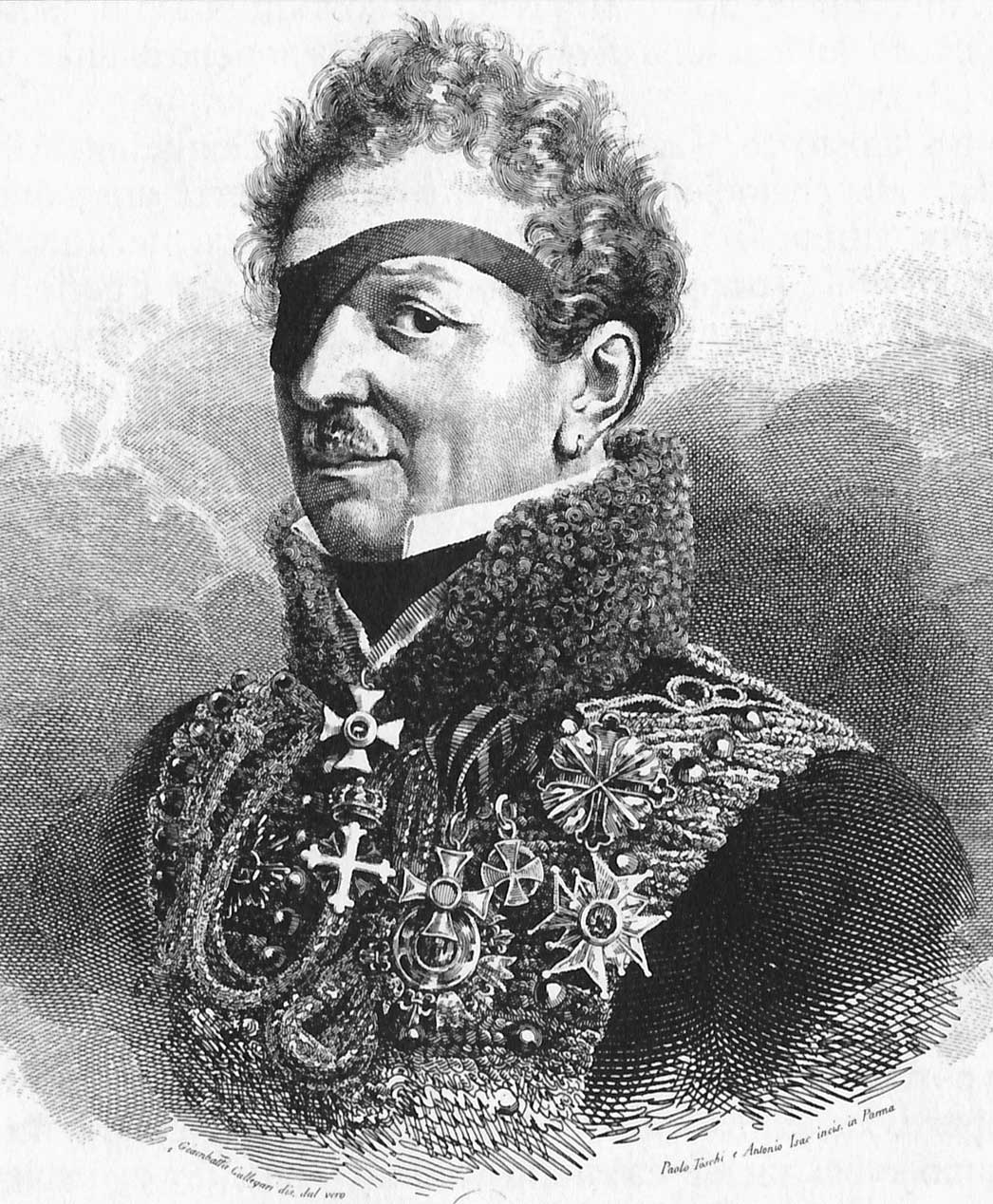
Count Adam Albert von Neipperg

Upon returning unexpectedly to Naples on 4 November, Murat introduced a series of measures intended to distance his kingdom from France while still preserving the appearance of loyalty to Napoleon. On 11 November he reopened Neapolitan ports to British shipping and, the following day, wrote to Napoleon offering to deploy 40,000 troops to defend the Kingdom of Italy along the Po. In return, he demanded recognition of the peninsula's independence from France.

At the same time, Murat intensified negotiations with Count von Mier and dispatched Mario Schininà di Sant'Elia to Sicily in an attempt to secure British recognition of his kingdom. Given Britain's longstanding support for the exiled Bourbon dynasty at Palermo, success was far from certain. Murat proposed an armistice, but Bentinck remained reluctant to negotiate, partly because of Murat's ambitions in Italy and partly because of concerns over Austria's future influence in the peninsula. (Note: Like Murat, Bentinck believed that Italy's long-term future lay in political unification. Unlike Murat, however, he envisaged a constitutional state modelled on Britain and independent of foreign domination, a vision that conflicted with both Murat's ambitions and Austrian policy.) Schininà returned to Naples without an agreement. The arrival of the inexperienced British ambassador to Vienna, George Hamilton-Gordon, 4th Earl of Aberdeen, together with Metternich's determination to deprive Napoleon of one of his last allies, proved decisive. In December 1813 the Austrian chancellor resolved to conclude an agreement recognising Murat's kingdom and bringing Naples into the Sixth Coalition. Negotiations on Austria's behalf were entrusted to Count Adam Albert von Neipperg, who was also instructed to keep Bentinck informed of their progress.

Meanwhile, Murat dispatched two divisions northward, one under General Carrascosa toward Rome and another under General d'Ambrosio toward Ancona. The move was marked by deliberate ambiguity. Murat assured Napoleon that these were the troops he had promised for operations against Austria, while simultaneously informing the Austrians that they would not adopt a hostile posture. During the first days of December, the Neapolitan army occupied Rome and Ancona, leaving the Franco-Italian command uncertain of Murat's true intentions. The French commanders in central Italy, Generals Miollis and Barbou, distrusted Murat and assumed a defensive posture, while General Filangieri advanced north through the peninsula, reaching Florence and, on 28 December, Bologna. His forces subsequently occupied the Marche and Romagna before establishing contact with General Pino.

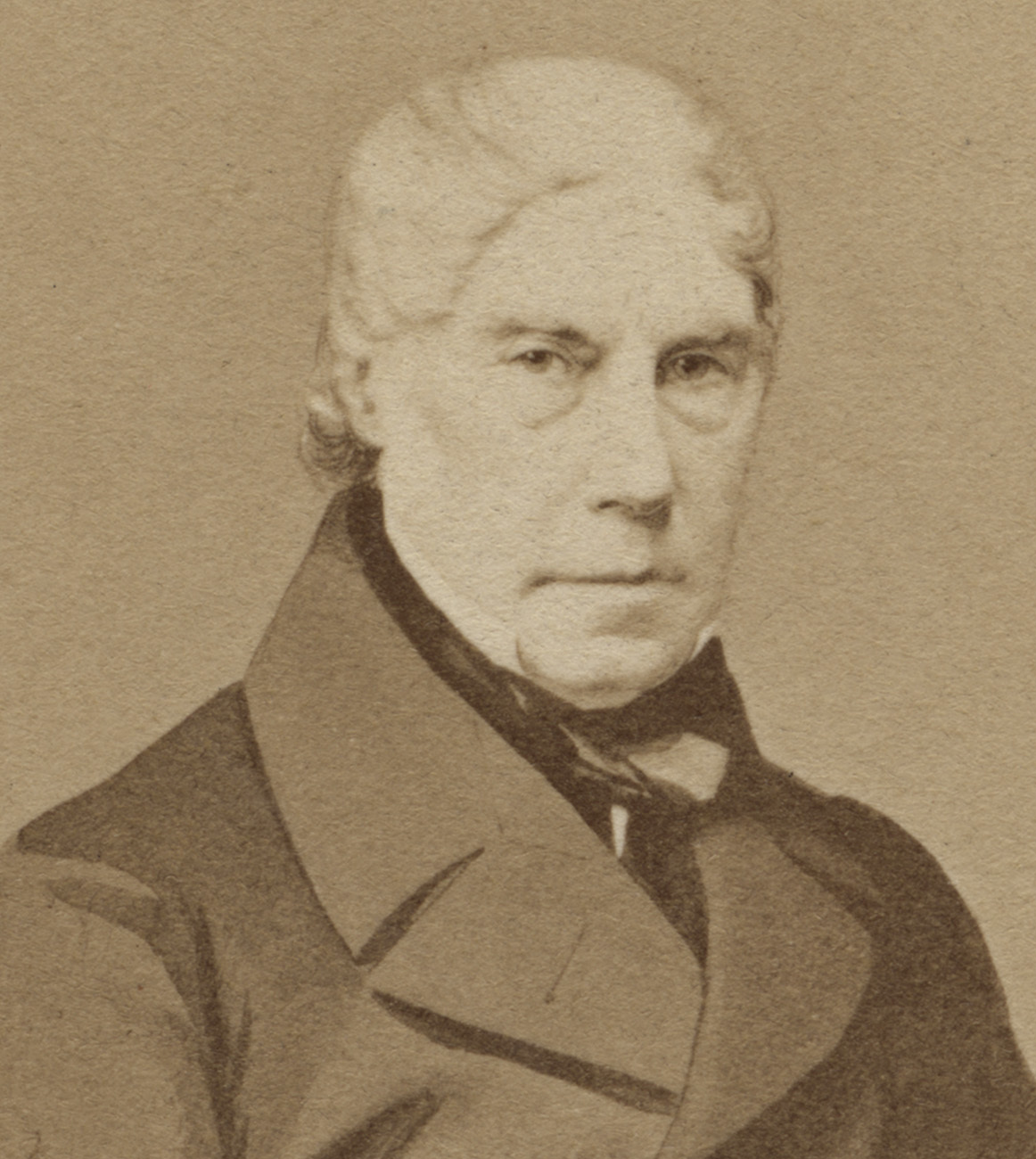
Lord Aberdeen in 1860

Count Neipperg arrived in Naples on 31 December 1813 carrying a letter from Metternich outlining Austria's terms for an alliance and its proposals regarding the future of Italy and Napoleon. Austria offered to recognize Murat as King of Naples, provided that he joined the Coalition and actively participated in the war. Neutrality was explicitly ruled out. Murat and his wife, Queen Caroline Bonaparte, accepted the proposal, believing it offered the best chance of preserving their throne. On 11 January 1814 the Kingdom of Naples and the Austrian Empire formally concluded their alliance. Naples agreed to send 30,000 troops north to reinforce the roughly 60,000 Austrian soldiers already operating in northern Italy and renounced all claims to Sicily. In return, Austria recognized Murat as the legitimate King of Naples and undertook to secure Ferdinand's formal renunciation of the throne. The agreement also envisaged Austrian support for the territorial expansion of the Neapolitan kingdom at the expense of the Papal States, amounting to territories with an estimated population of 400,000 inhabitants. Neipperg subsequently informed Bentinck of the agreement and invited him to endorse it on behalf of the United Kingdom, in accordance with the policy favoured by Lord Aberdeen. Bentinck, however, had received no official instructions from London and declined to ratify the treaty. Instead, he limited himself to concluding a three-month armistice with Murat on 3 February.

Marshal Pérignon, who requested a formal audience with the Neapolitan court, failed to persuade Murat and Queen Caroline to reconsider their decision, as both remained determined to preserve their kingdom at all costs. Even after concluding the agreement with Austria, Murat's position remained precarious. Ferdinand had not formally renounced the Neapolitan throne, while Murat was now expected to employ his army against Eugène's Franco-Italian forces, despite the large number of French officers and soldiers still serving in Neapolitan ranks. Many of the army's most experienced officers and veteran units subsequently left Neapolitan service and returned to France, unwilling to fight against Napoleon. Their departure significantly weakened the effectiveness of Murat's army, depriving it of much of its experienced leadership and reducing the overall quality of its field forces.

=== Bellegarde's arrival and the retreat on the Mincio River ===
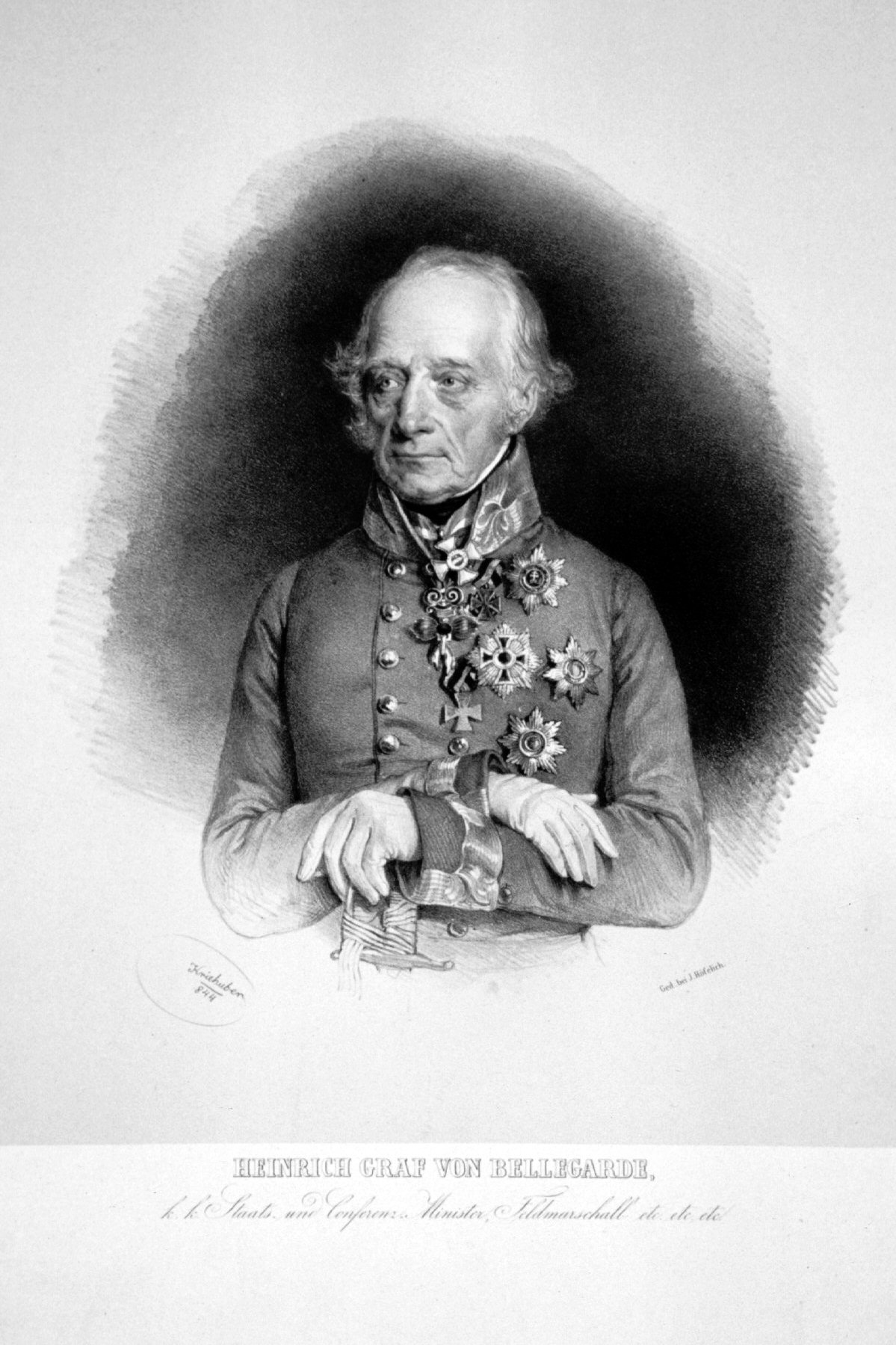
Marshal Bellegarde, 1844

The end of the German campaign following the Battle of Leipzig released considerable numbers of troops and experienced commanders for both belligerents. By the middle of December, the Austrian army in Italy had been reinforced by approximately 25,000 soldiers transferred from the German theatre. They were accompanied by Field Marshal Heinrich Bellegarde, a veteran of the Italian campaigns of 1799 and 1805. Bellegarde replaced Hiller, whose cautious conduct and slow pace of operations had drawn repeated criticism from the Austrian Aulic Council, of which Bellegarde himself was both a member and president. He arrived at Vicenza on 15 December and formally assumed command of the Austrian armies in Italy the following day. Eugène likewise received reinforcements. Italian troops returning from the Peninsular War were incorporated into his army to compensate for the heavy losses caused by desertion, while a new levy of 12,0000 conscripts was ordered throughout the French Empire, around 15,000 of whom were to be raised and serve in the Kingdom of Italy. By the end of December the Franco-Italian army numbered roughly 41,000 men, increasing to about 50,000 by mid-January, while the Austrians fielded approximately 55,000 troops.

The second half of December and the opening days of January saw little military activity, apart from a minor engagement near Castagnaro and the continued advance of the Neapolitan army into central and northern Italy. The Franco-Italians devoted this period chiefly to reorganizing their forces, while the Austrians concentrated on reducing the French garrisons that still held out in the territories occupied during the 1813 campaign.

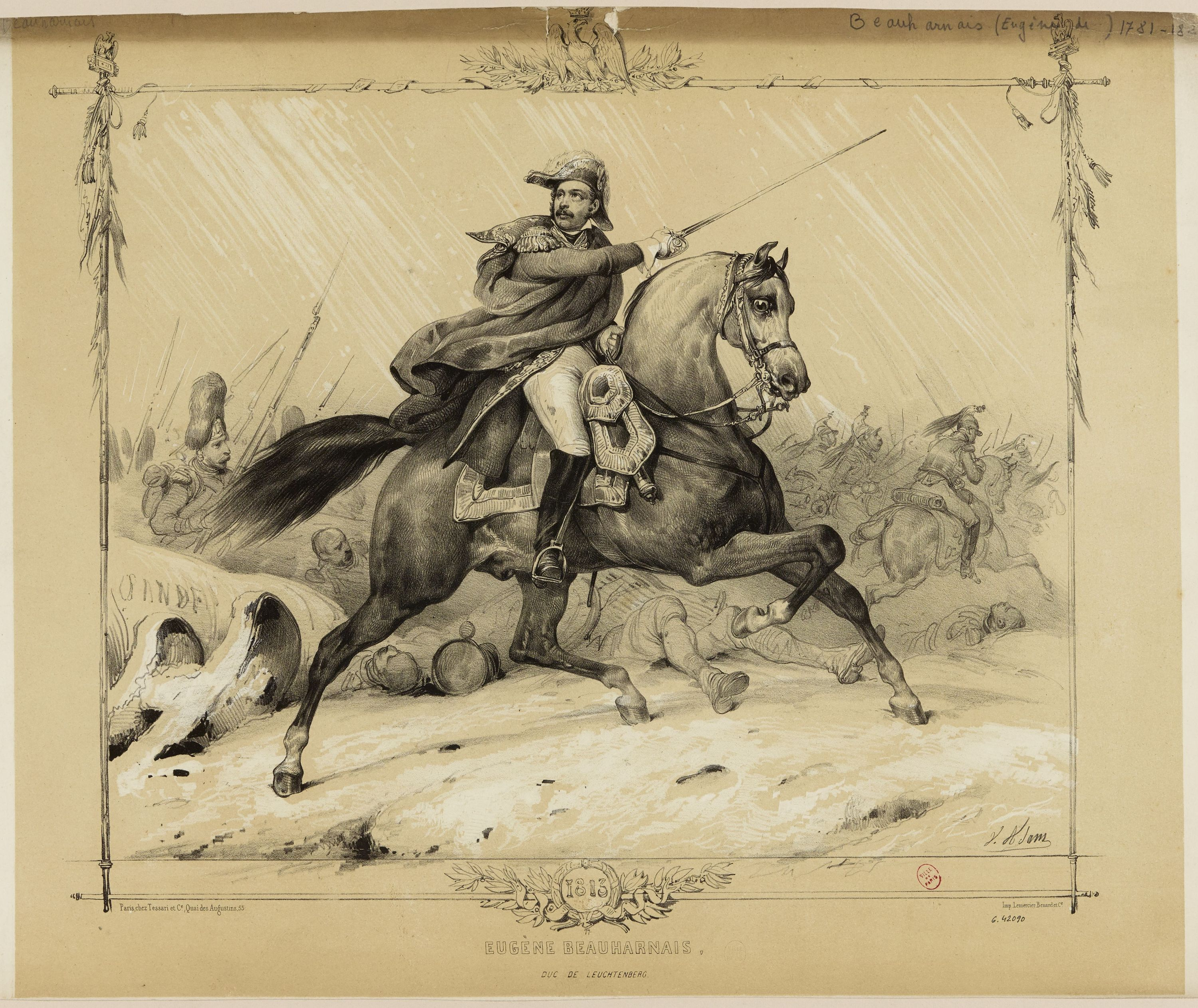
Eugène in action during the campaigns of 1813

The news of Joachim Murat's defection spread rapidly. Napoleon learned of it as early as 13 January, the same day that, according to some accounts, a Neapolitan envoy arrived at Bologna to formally announce the opening of hostilities between the Kingdoms of Naples and Italy. Eugène, however, remained unaware that Murat had changed sides and continued to correspond personally with the Neapolitan king, whose increasingly ambiguous conduct had aroused his suspicions. He even dispatched General Gifflenga to Naples to ascertain Murat's intentions. Murat avoided giving a clear answer, claiming that he had received no formal request to commit his troops.

The position of the Neapolitan army was consequently an unusual one. Although deployed in northern Italy, it was under instructions neither to attack the Austrians nor to engage the Franco-Italian forces. For the time being, it merely occupied the cities of Emilia, in accordance with Murat's explicit orders. After joining his army outside the blockaded fortress of Ancona on 23 January, Murat marched north, crossed paths with Nugent's column, and entered Bologna on 31 January. His reception proved distinctly cool: only a small number of inhabitants came out to watch him pass, despite his escort of the Royal Guard. A few cries of encouragement were heard, but they clearly did not reflect the sentiments of the population towards the former French marshal.

Meanwhile, with the war now decisively turning in favour of the Coalition and following his brother-in-law's betrayal, Napoleon instructed his stepson on 17 January to abandon Italy and withdraw behind the Western Alps. Eugène refused, believing it preferable to confront the Austro-Neapolitan armies in northern Italy and judging a withdrawal across the Alps impracticable, particularly since it would require abandoning the Piedmontese fortresses, which remained essential for any future French campaign in Italy. Murat's evasive replies nevertheless convinced him that negotiations between Naples and Austria had indeed been successful. He therefore resolved to defend Lombardy and, if possible, prevent the Neapolitan army from crossing the Po. Achieving this objective required protecting the line between Borgoforte and Piacenza while simultaneously maintaining the defence of the Quadrilatero. As his manpower was insufficient to accomplish both tasks, despite the recent reinforcements, Eugène decided to abandon the Adige and establish his main defensive position along the Mincio. At the same time, fearing a British landing against Genoa or elsewhere along the Ligurian coast, he instructed the local French governor, Prince Camillo Borghese, to strengthen the province's defences. Borghese immediately began raising additional funds and troops, while General Fresia assumed command of Genoa and the Ligurian littoral.

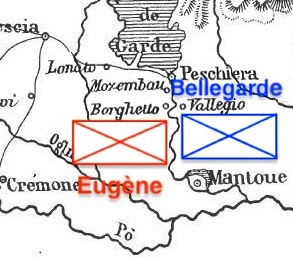
Positions of the two armies before the Battle of Mincio River

By the middle of January, Bellegarde had begun planning an offensive intended to break the operational stalemate that had prevailed for nearly two months. He considered a direct crossing of the flooded and heavily fortified Adige impracticable, believing that only by forcing Eugène to weaken one sector of the front could such an operation succeed. Accordingly, he substantially reinforced Nugent's corps, assigning it the task of advancing across the Po Valley towards Piacenza, crossing the Po, and either severing the Franco-Italian line of communications or threatening it sufficiently to compel Eugène to abandon both the Adige and the Mincio. At the same time, Sommariva was ordered to demonstrate aggressively in the mountains north of Verona to distract the Franco-Italian commander, while Radivojevich was instructed to search for a suitable crossing point on the Adige.

Bellegarde deliberately excluded the Neapolitan army from these operations. Despite the close cooperation between Austrian and Neapolitan headquarters and Murat's evident commitment to maintaining the blockade of Ancona, the Austrian commander still regarded his new allies with a degree of suspicion. Nugent began advancing towards Faenza and Bologna on 27 January and prepared to continue towards Modena and Reggio Emilia in the following days, while Eugène sought Napoleon's approval to abandon the Adige in favour of the Mincio, awaiting the Emperor's final instructions. On 1 February he issued a proclamation to his army publicly announcing Murat's defection and the withdrawal to the Mincio, a movement that commenced on 3 February. The redeployment was completed the following day, allowing the Austrians to occupy Verona. Shortly afterwards, detachments of the two armies clashed briefly at Villafranca, where the Austrian troops under General Steffanini were repulsed with several men killed or captured.

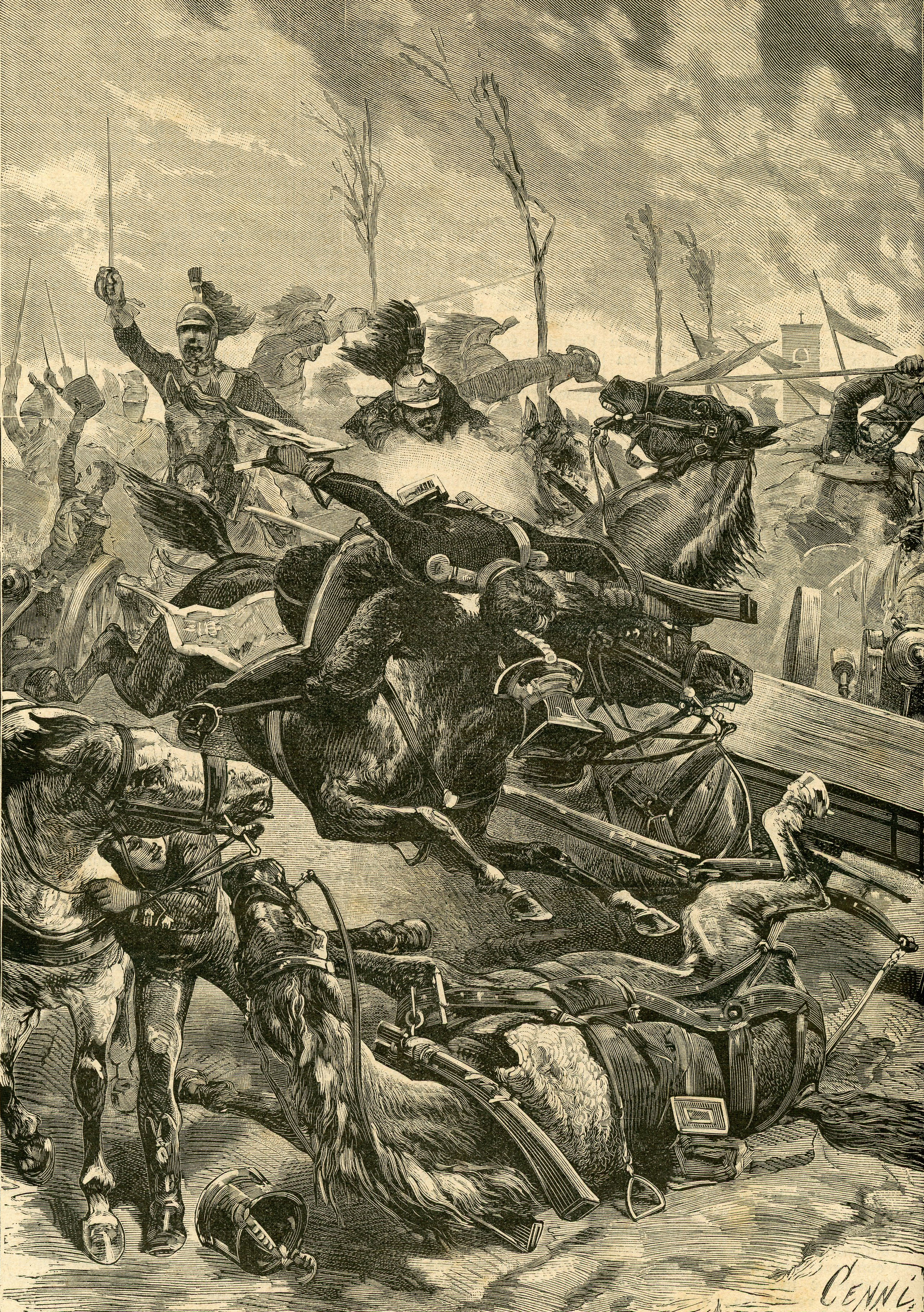
The Battle of the Mincio River

Between 4 and 7 February, the Austrian army deployed along the right bank of the Mincio. Bellegarde was convinced that Eugène had already abandoned the river in favour of a new defensive line around Cremona, and accordingly planned to force a crossing on the following day. Eugène, however, was preparing to give battle. With the Neapolitans approaching Piacenza, it was only a matter of time before they crossed the Po and threatened his rear. If he detached troops to defend the Po, Bellegarde would almost certainly exploit the opportunity to force the Mincio. His only viable option was therefore to engage the Austrian army and gain time. Holding the bridges at Goito and Monzambano, as well as the fortresses of Peschiera and Mantua, and knowing that the Austrians were concentrated around Villafranca and Roverbella, Eugène decided to cross the river himself on 8 February and launch an offensive against Bellegarde's army.

Completely unaware that their opponents were attempting the same manoeuvre, the two armies accidentally crossed one another's paths. The Austrians intended to force the river at Borghetto, while the Franco-Italian army planned to cross at Goito. As a result, the Battle of the Mincio River unfolded simultaneously on two separate battlefields, several dozen kilometres apart and on opposite sides of the river. The Franco-Italians defended Borghetto while attacking at Goito, whereas the Austrians attempted precisely the reverse. After a long and confused engagement, both armies successfully held their respective defensive positions. On the following day Bellegarde withdrew his forces to the right bank of the river, while Eugène retired to the left bank. The largest battle of the entire campaign thus ended in a costly stalemate, although strategically it slightly favoured the Franco-Italians, whose principal objective had been to buy time. During the night of 9–10 February, the Austrians made another attempt to cross the Mincio at Borghetto, but were repulsed, after which Marcognet's division was assigned to secure the position. On 14 February, an Austrian detachment attempted to enter Lombardy through the Val Trompia, only to be driven back by General Bonfanti, who had recently replaced Gifflenga. A further Austrian attempt near Salò met the same fate. Bellegarde's lack of progress in forcing the Mincio soon compelled him to justify his slow advance in a memorandum addressed to Schwarzenberg and Emperor Francis.

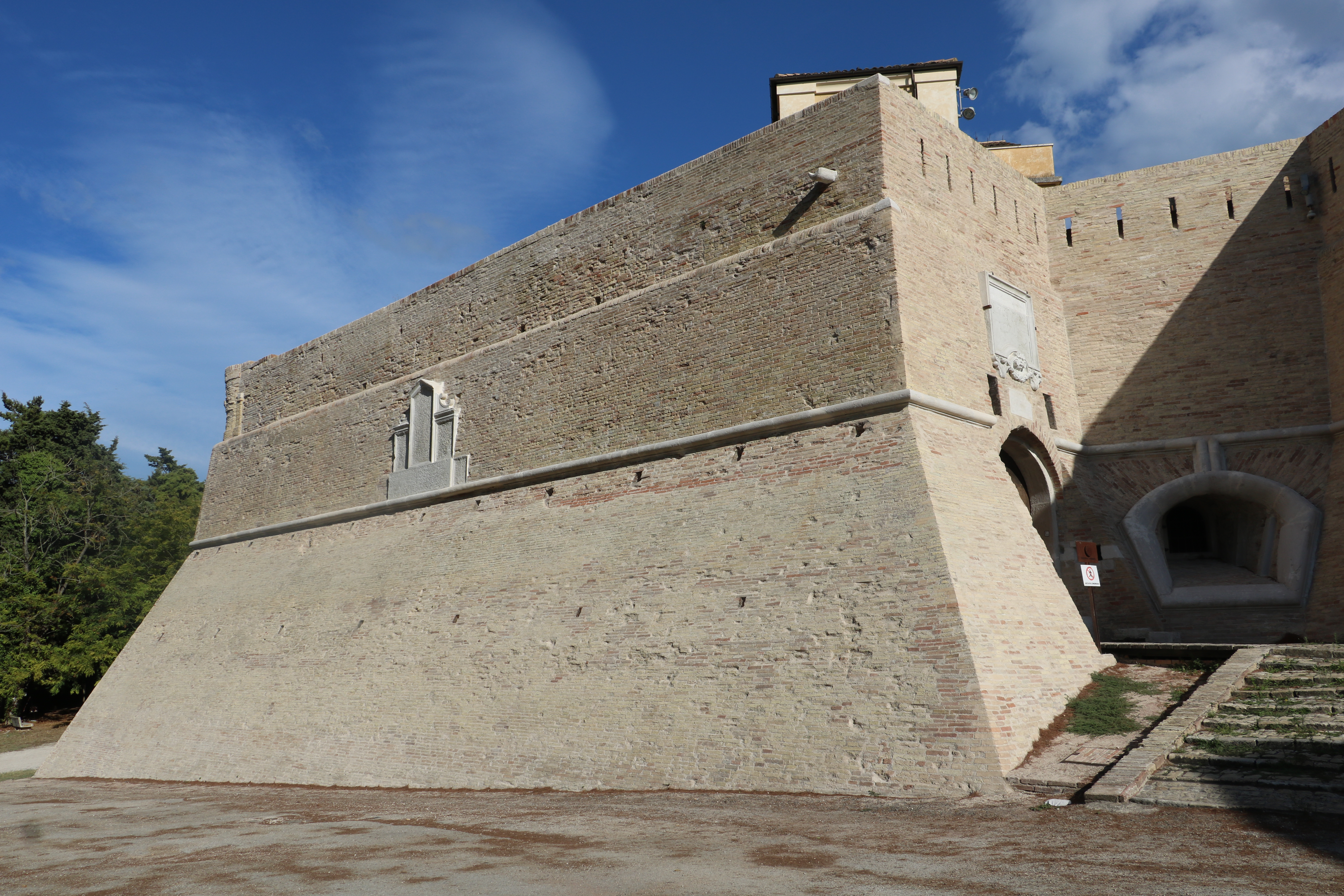
The walls of the Citadel of Ancona

In reality, Eugène's greatest concern was not the Austrian army in Venetia but the Austro-Neapolitan forces assembling beyond the Po. Piacenza remained the critical point, held by General Gratien and the reserve, while General Severoli, recently returned from the Peninsular War, covered the position from the Enza River. On 15 February, using an alleged sortie by the French garrison at Ancona as a pretext, Murat formally declared war on France. While General Barbou and the French troops withdrew into the Citadel of Ancona, the Neapolitans occupied the city and assumed control of the French-administered provinces of central Italy. Two days later, on 17 February, Austrian forces struck Severoli's corps at Fontana Fredda and Fiorenzuola, reaching the area before the Neapolitans. Unable to withstand the superior enemy force, Severoli fell back on Piacenza with the brigades of d'Arnauld and Rouyer. The continuing Austro-Neapolitan threat to Piacenza, whose loss would have seriously endangered the Franco-Italian line of communication between Genoa and Turin, eventually forced Eugène to transfer Grenier's corps into Emilia at the end of February.

At the same time, Murat's generals considered constructing a bridge across the Po at Sacca, near Casalmaggiore. Work progressed slowly, perhaps because of reports of Napoleon's victories over Blücher in France, or perhaps because Austria had not yet formally ratified its treaty with Naples. By the end of February the bridge had been completed and the Neapolitan army prepared to cross. On 26 and 27 February, however, General Bonnemains, despite being heavily outnumbered, decisively repulsed Colonel Metzko's troops after they had crossed the river, forcing them back to the southern bank. This unexpected reverse, together with the redeployment of several Austro-Neapolitan detachments, weakened Nugent's position. Seizing the opportunity, Grenier crossed the Taro on 1 March and attacked Nugent's division at the Battle of Parma the following day. The Franco-Italian army secured a significant victory, inflicting roughly 2,300 casualties and prisoners on the enemy, who retreated first behind the Enza and then the Secchia. Grenier's success was also aided by a Franco-Italian attack near Guastalla on the previous day, which had inflicted considerable losses on a Neapolitan cavalry detachment. He subsequently consolidated his position, anchoring his right wing between Fornovo and Pontremoli and his left at Colorno. Freed from Nugent's pressure, Severoli occupied Reggio Emilia, while Eugène advanced a detachment towards Ostiglia, alarming Bellegarde sufficiently to induce him to pull his forces back from the Mincio towards the Adige. Having achieved his objective, Grenier then withdrew across the Po to Borgoforte.

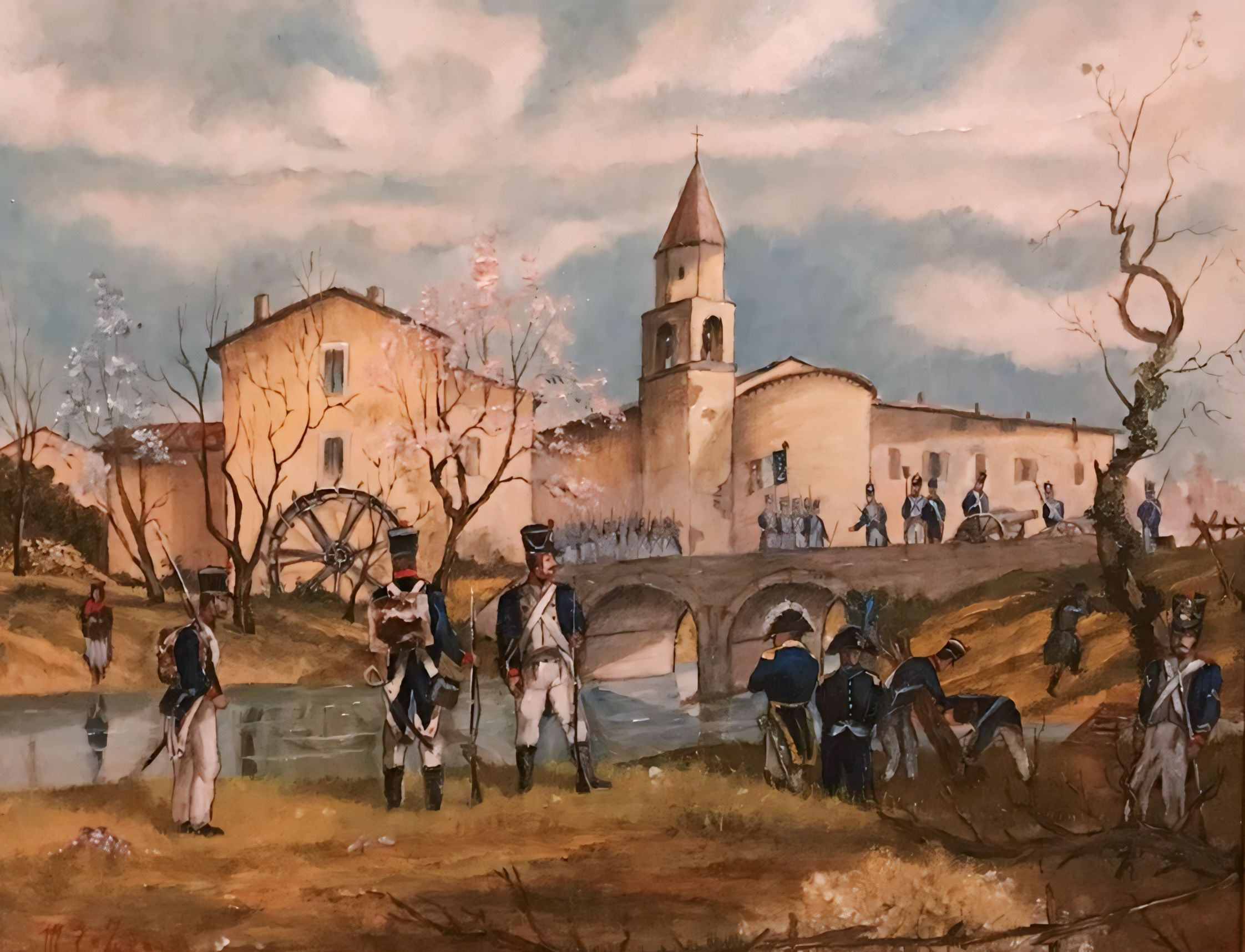
The Battle of San Maurizio fought between Franco-Italian and Austro-Neapolitan forces on 7 March 1814

In letters addressed to Emperor Francis on 28 February and 6 March, Bellegarde expressed growing frustration with Murat's conduct, which he regarded as ranging from passive to actively detrimental to the Austrian war effort, particularly in the aftermath of Parma. He was especially irritated when Murat reproached him for failing to exploit the diversion created by the attempted crossing of the Po. Having already concluded that Neapolitan hesitation stemmed largely from the lack of formal ratification of the Austro-Neapolitan agreement, Bellegarde acted with characteristic diplomatic caution by dispatching Colonel de Bauffremont to Murat carrying a personal letter from Emperor Francis formally confirming the alliance.

The letter, delivered on 4 March, removed the last excuse for continued inaction. Although Murat had deliberately sought to coordinate his actions with developments in France, hoping to avoid committing himself before receiving firm guarantees from Austria, he now realised that further hesitation was no longer possible. Determined to demonstrate both his military value and his commitment to the Coalition, he coordinated with Nugent for a joint offensive against Grenier's advanced positions in Emilia-Romagna. Over the following two days, Austro-Neapolitan forces concentrated opposite San Maurizio, just outside Reggio. There, Severoli's troops—whose commander was seriously wounded during the fighting—attempted to block the Coalition advance but were ultimately driven back and nearly surrounded. Only Murat's sudden and somewhat inexplicable diplomatic intervention allowed the Franco-Italian force to evacuate the city unmolested.

=== Internal tensions slow the Allied Advance ===
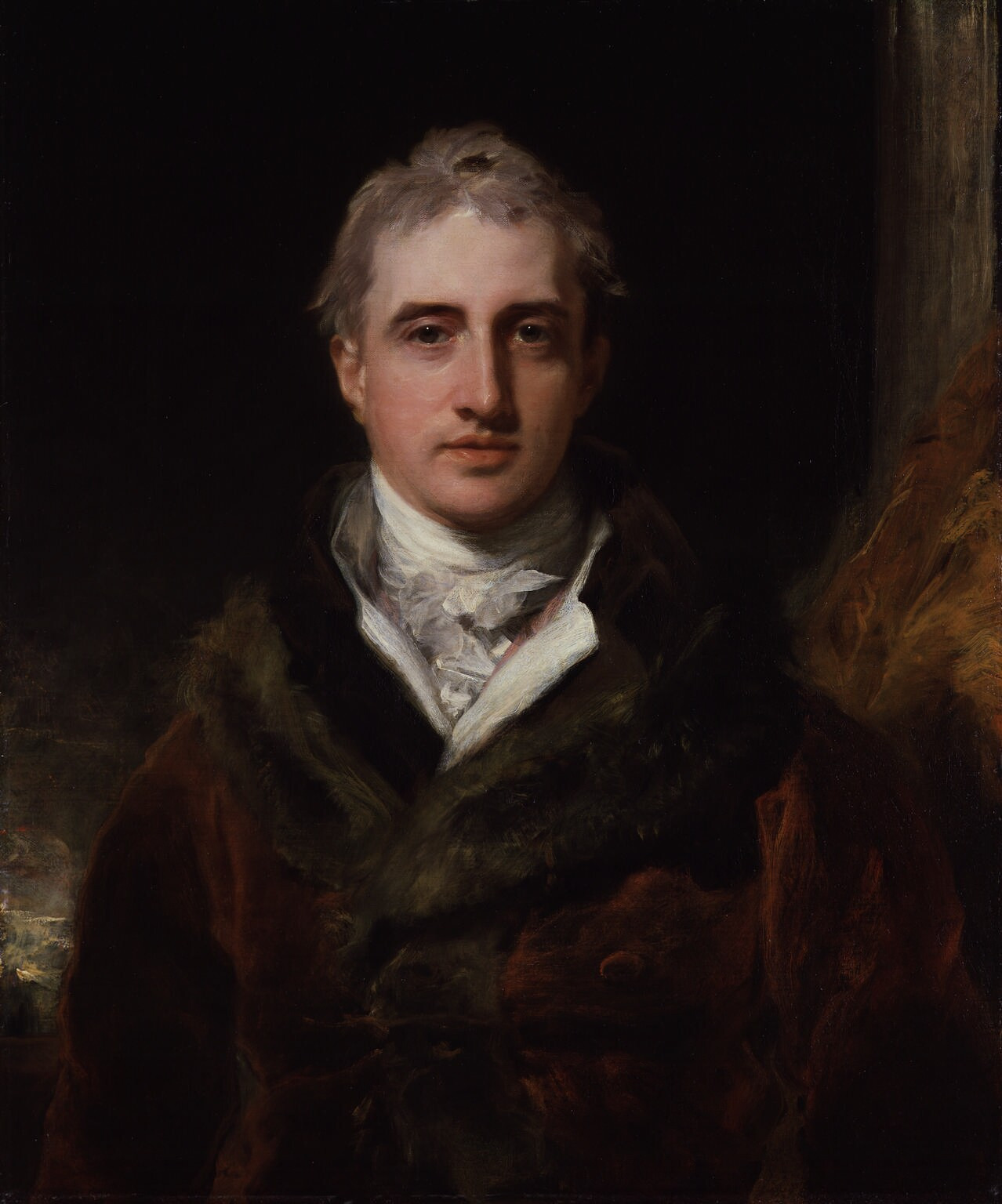
Lord Castlereagh, the British Foreign Secretary

On 7 March, part of Bentinck's Anglo-Sicilian expeditionary force landed in Tuscany. Some 7,000 men — 1,600 Sicilians and 5,400 British troops—had sailed from Palermo on 28 February and disembarked at Livorno, quickly occupying the city except for its fortress, which remained in French hands. Bentinck immediately issued a proclamation calling upon the population to rise against French rule. While awaiting further reinforcements from Sicily, the British commander became embroiled in heated disputes with the Sicilian representatives, who had publicly declared that King Ferdinand would never renounce his claim to the throne of Naples. Rather than distancing himself from these statements, Bentinck seized every opportunity to undermine Murat, whom he deeply distrusted. His blunt manner and open hostility towards the Neapolitan king—an antipathy fully reciprocated—further embittered relations between the two commanders and persuaded Murat to suspend any further serious offensive operations against Eugène's army.

The two Coalition commanders met at Reggio on 16 March and remained there for the following three days. Their discussions proved tense from the outset. Murat had ordered General Lechi to occupy Tuscany, but Bentinck insisted that the Neapolitan king had no legitimate claim to the region, which had historically belonged to the House of Habsburg-Lorraine. He further demanded that part of Tuscany should serve as a base for the Anglo-Sicilian army. Murat attempted to compromise, offering either to place Bentinck in command of all Coalition troops in Tuscany or to submit the dispute to Foreign Secretary Castlereagh, but both proposals were rejected. Receiving no satisfactory reply from either Murat or his foreign minister, the Duke of Gallo, Bentinck travelled to Verona to confer with Bellegarde and the Russian envoy Balashov, who had arrived specifically to discuss Murat's role within the Coalition. Bellegarde acknowledged that dealing with the Neapolitan king had become increasingly difficult but declined to intervene personally, leaving the diplomats assembled at Verona to prepare a formal proposal instead. Despite receiving explicit instructions from Castlereagh to seek a compromise, Bentinck chose the opposite course and presented Murat with an ultimatum. Following a conference at Bologna on 29 March between Murat and representatives of the Allied powers, the Neapolitan king reluctantly yielded to Bentinck's demands, while the latter's second division, recently landed in Tuscany, was already advancing towards Liguria.

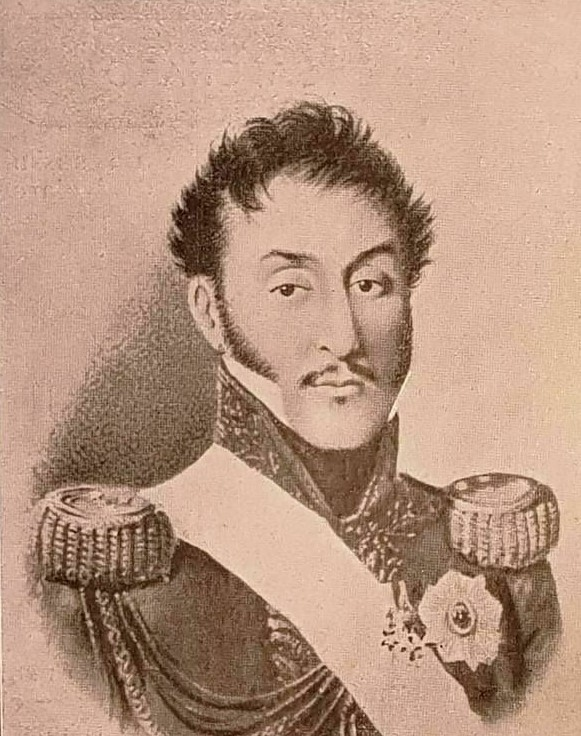
Michele Carrascosa

Murat's alliance with the Coalition was thus placed under severe strain. Relations with the Austrians had already become uneasy, as both sides questioned the other's sincerity, and Bentinck's behaviour even led Murat to contemplate changing sides once again. Napoleon himself received Murat's letters and instructed Eugène that he was prepared to accommodate his marshal's demands, authorising the Viceroy to negotiate on his behalf, while remaining fully aware that any agreement with a defector involved considerable risk. Under no circumstances, however, was Eugène to concede either Genoa or Piedmont. The Emperor had evidently not yet learned of the Battle of San Maurizio and Murat's complete commitment to the Coalition cause. Precisely because of that engagement, Eugène refused to negotiate seriously, maintaining only the appearance of discussions in order to gain time.

Nevertheless, representatives of both sides met on 22 March near San Giacomo Po, where Generals Zucchi, acting for Eugène, and Carrascosa, representing Murat, discussed the future partition of Italy. The Neapolitan proposals were extraordinary: Murat demanded that his kingdom should extend northwards to the Taro and the Po, while allowing the Kingdom of Italy to retain Piedmont and Liguria only if it agreed to block the Alpine passes connecting France with Italy. Since Zucchi lacked plenipotentiary authority, he withdrew to consult Eugène, who was equally outraged by the proposal. Both men nevertheless continued the correspondence with Murat solely to prolong the negotiations, even suggesting a secret suspension of hostilities between their armies. On the following day Eugène informed Napoleon that an agreement with Murat had become impossible, thereby bringing the negotiations to an end. The Austrians, meanwhile, were fully aware that contacts had taken place, having observed Neapolitan officers travelling towards Mantua, where Eugène had established his headquarters.

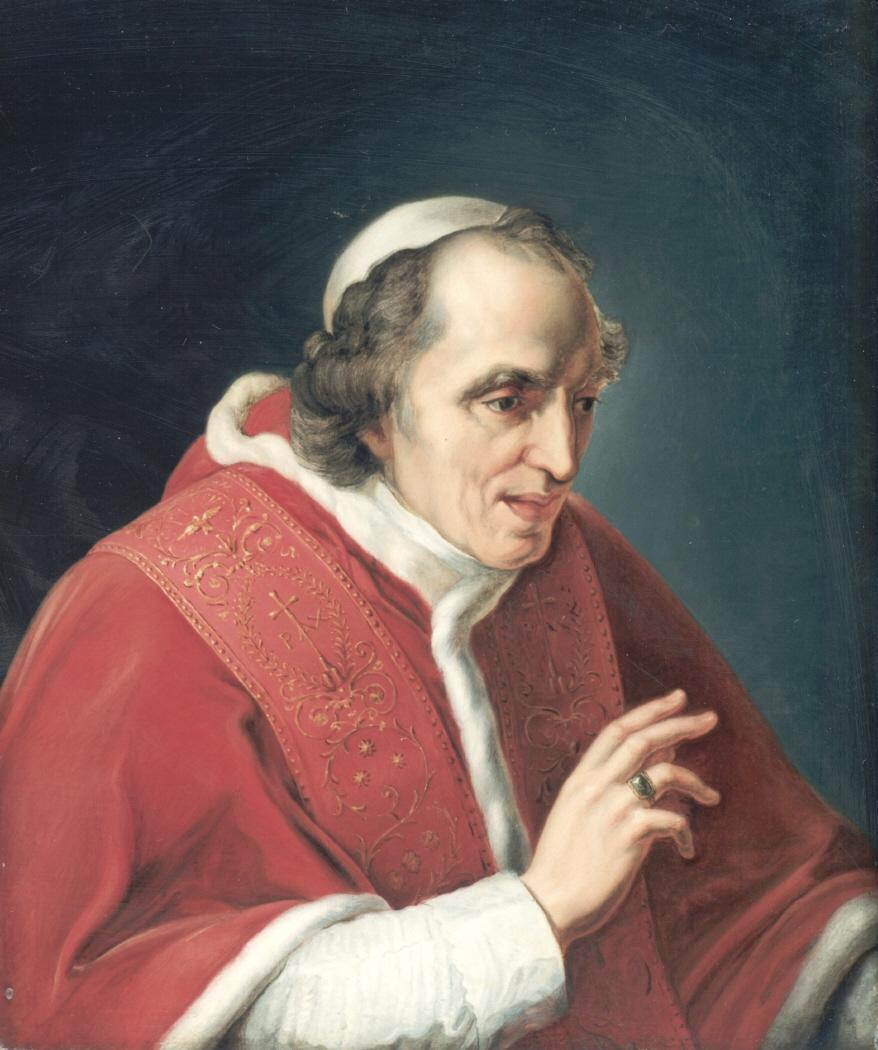
Pope Pius VII. When Carrascosa attempted to stop him by claiming that no horses were available beyond Reggio, the Pope reportedly replied that he would reach Rome even on foot.

Meanwhile, Pope Pius VII, released from his captivity in France by Napoleon during the winter months, was escorted back to Italy on his journey to Rome. His return posed yet another challenge for Murat. Most of his subjects remained devout Catholics, and the Pope represented an unquestioned moral authority. The restoration of the Papal States threatened to undermine Murat's broader ambition of unifying Italy under his own rule. The two met at Bologna after Carrascosa and the Duke of Gallo had failed to prevent the Pope from continuing his journey south. Realising that further resistance was futile, Murat promised to restore only those territories that he had occupied after abandoning Rome, while retaining Emilia-Romagna and the Marches, lands that had been removed from papal authority under the Treaty of Tolentino in 1797.

Military activity remained limited throughout the second half of March and the first weeks of April. Apart from a minor engagement near Monzambano and Borghetto on 11 March and a small naval action between the flotillas of Eugène and Bellegarde on 15 March, the Mincio front remained largely quiet, as did the situation in Emilia, where the Austro-Neapolitan advance did not reach the Nure until 15 April. Each commander had his own reasons for avoiding major operations. Eugène, confronted by an increasingly precarious strategic situation, could scarcely risk an offensive. Murat had lost any real enthusiasm for the Coalition cause, limiting himself to minor actions and demonstrations. Bellegarde found himself balancing the delicate task of mediating between Murat, Bentinck, and the Austrian government, while disease and desertion steadily reduced the strength of his own army, making any large-scale offensive impractical. After nearly a month of relative inactivity, the Austro-Neapolitan army finally resumed its advance by attacking General Maucune's positions on the Taro; after forcing the river, the Coalition troops successfully broke the Franco-Italian line and compelled Eugène's forces to fall back on Piacenza.

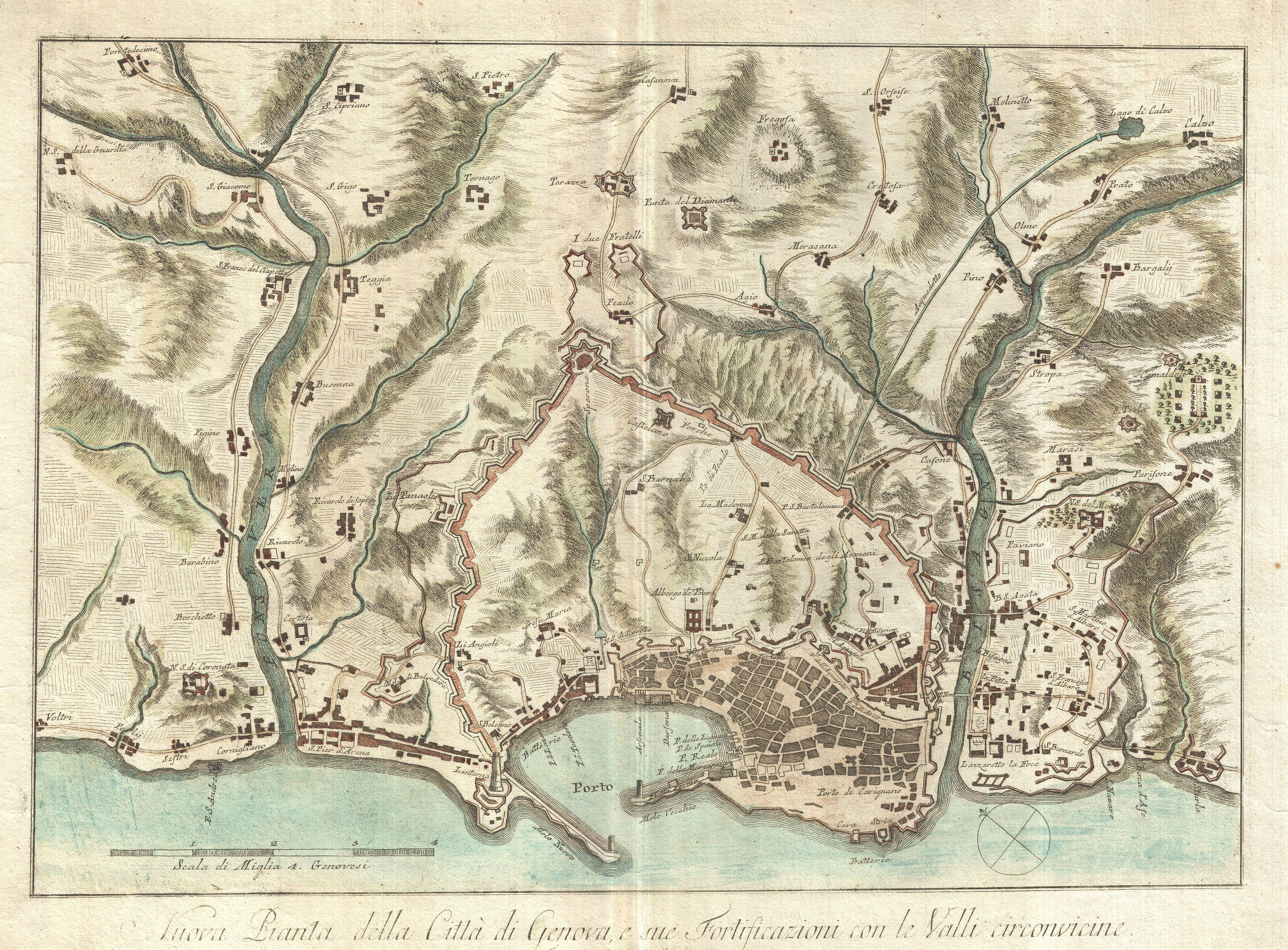
Genoa and its defences in 1800

Of the four principal commanders involved in the campaign, only Bentinck achieved consistent and tangible military success. His army advanced steadily along the Riviera di Levante towards Genoa, first ùcapturing La Spezia before turning against the Ligurian capital. British and French forces first clashed on Monte Fasce, overlooking the city, and the British victory there marked the opening of the Siege of Genoa. Bentinck and Montresor captured the forts of Santa Tecla and Richelieu, while Admiral Pellew's fleet maintained a heavy bombardment from the sea. General Fresia, commanding the defence, capitulated on 18 April. The city was evacuated three days later, and the surviving French troops withdrew towards Pinerolo. British forces entered Genoa on 21 April. Bentinck's arrival, together with the widespread belief that Britain favoured a restoration of the pre-Revolutionary political order, revived hopes among the Genoese for the restoration of the old Republic of Genoa. Similar expectations would soon emerge in Venice and Milan.

== End of the campaign ==
=== Collapse of the Napoleonic states ===
On 30 March 1814, Coalition troops entered Paris following the Battle of Paris. A rapid chain of events soon led to Napoleon's abdication, France's capitulation under the Treaty of Fontainebleau (1814), and ultimately the surrender of the French satellite states. News of Napoleon's abdication reached Italy on 5 April, while confirmation of France's surrender arrived ten days later. Realising that further resistance had become futile, Eugène decided to bring the campaign to an end.

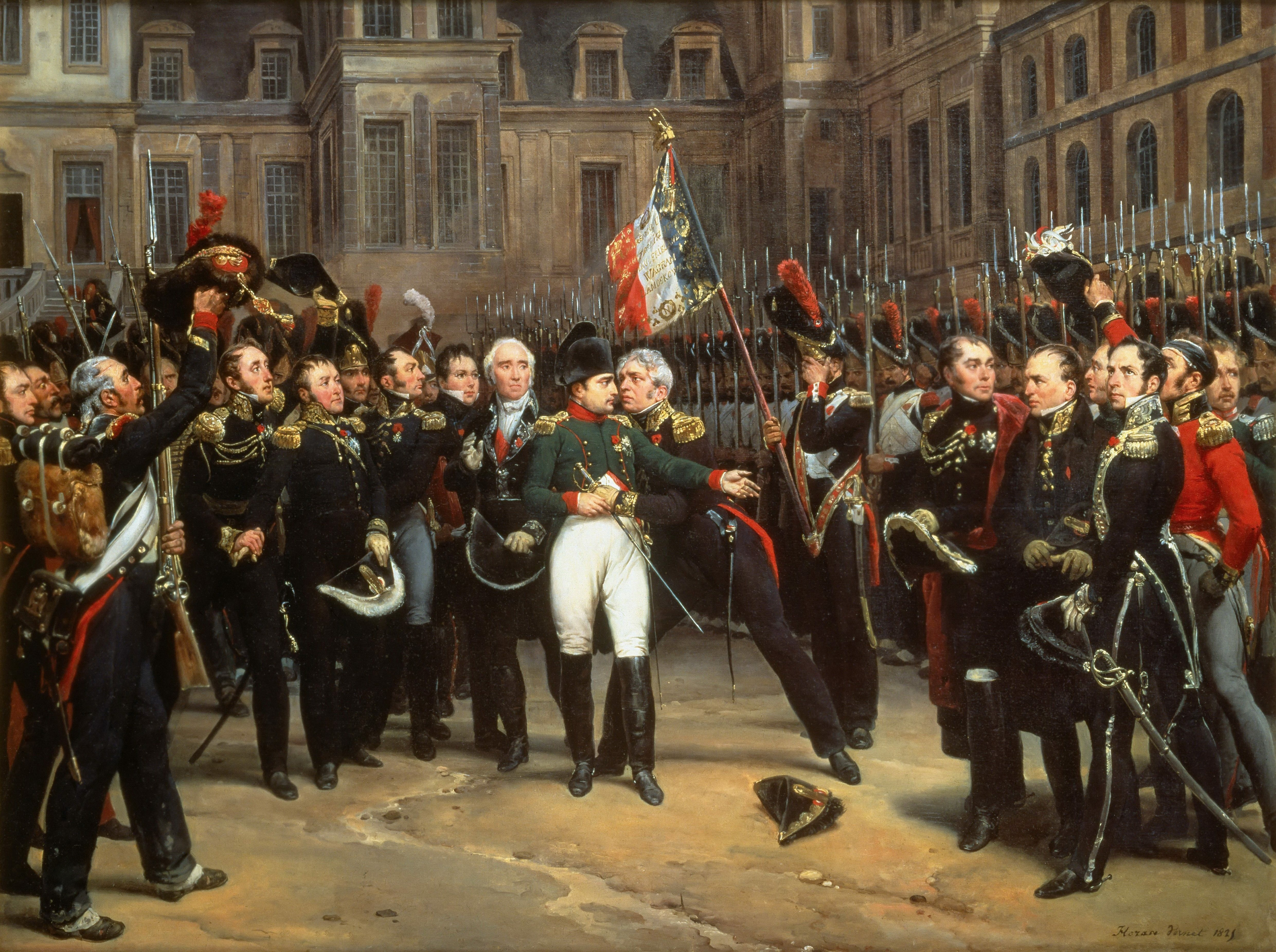
Napoleon bidding farewell to the Imperial Guard

After receiving confirmation of Napoleon's abdication, Eugène appointed General Carlo Zucchi as his plenipotentiary and instructed him to negotiate with Count Adam Albert von Neipperg, representing Bellegarde. The resulting Convention of Schiarino-Rizzino was signed on 16 April, establishing an armistice between the Franco-Italian, Austrian and British forces. French troops agreed to withdraw towards the French frontier, while the Italian forces were allowed to remain in place until relieved by the Coalition. The remaining fortresses still resisting Austrian sieges were ordered to surrender by 20 April. Because news of the armistice did not immediately reach every garrison, several strongholds continued to resist for a few more days: Venice capitulated on 20 April, while Austrian troops entered Milan, Brescia and Mantua later that month.

Following Napoleon's abdication, Eugène briefly emerged as a candidate for the throne of the Kingdom of Italy. His candidacy failed, however, owing to Austrian opposition and political divisions within the kingdom, while the Milan revolt of 1814 further weakened his position. On 23 April he signed the Convention of Mantua, allowing Austrian forces to occupy the remainder of northern Italy, before departing into exile in Bavaria. The collapse of the Kingdom of Italy was regarded by many Italian patriots and intellectuals as the failure of the first durable political framework encompassing much of the Italian peninsula under a single government. Although many had become critical of French rule, figures such as Ugo Foscolo and Alessandro Manzoni hoped that the kingdom might survive Napoleon's fall. Instead, the decisions of the Congress of Vienna dismantled the Napoleonic state, while the memory of a unified and comparatively liberal Italian kingdom later became an important source of inspiration for many veterans and patriots involved in the Risorgimento.

=== Restoration of the Italian states ===
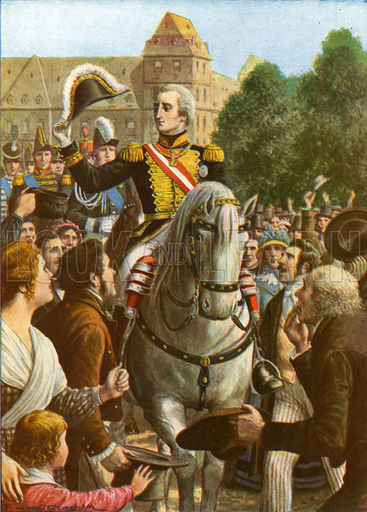
Victor Emmanuel I returning to Turin

Although hostilities had ended, the political settlement of Italy remained unresolved. The Congress of Vienna undertook the wider reorganisation of Europe, while the Coalition powers gradually implemented a policy of restoration throughout the peninsula. The House of Savoy was restored to the Kingdom of Sardinia, whereas the hopes of reviving the Republics of Genoa and Venice proved short-lived: Genoa was annexed to the Kingdom of Sardinia, while Lombardy and Venetia were incorporated into the Austrian Empire as the newly established Kingdom of Lombardy–Venetia.

Murat's rule also proved short-lived. The conservative settlement promoted by the Congress of Vienna and the hostility of most of the great powers favoured the restoration of the Bourbon monarchy over the Napoleonic marshal. Following Napoleon's return to France in 1815, Murat attempted to preserve his throne by declaring war on Austria, but was decisively defeated during the Neapolitan War. A final attempt to recover his kingdom ended with his capture and execution at Pizzo on 13 October 1815.

== Bibliography ==
- Bianco, Giuseppe (1902). La Sicilia durante l'occupazione inglese (1806-1815) (in Italian). Palermo: Alberto Reber.
- Bodart, Gaston (1908). Militär-historisches Kriegs-Lexikon (1618–1905). Wien und Leipzig, C. W. Stern.
- Botta, Carlo (1824). Storia d'Italia dal 1789 al 1814 (in Italian). Italy: unknown.
- Colletta, Pietro (1852). Storia del reame di Napoli (in Italian). Vol. 2. Turin: Cugini Pomba e Compagnia.
- Coppi, Antonio (1834). Annali d'Italia dal 1750 (in Italian). Vol. 7. Stamperia de Romanis.
- Cust, Edward (1863). Annals of the wars of the nineteenth century. Vol. 5. London: John Murray. OCLC 278260284.
- de Vaudoncourt, Frédéric François Guillaume (1817). Histoire des campagnes d'Italie en 1813 et 1814: avec un atlas militaire (in French). London: Thomas Egerton – via google.co.uk.
- de Vaudoncourt, Frédéric François Guillaume (1828). Histoire politique et militaire du prince Eugène Napoléon, vice-roi d'Italie (in French). Vol. 2. Paris: Mongie.
- Hugo, Abel (1837). France militaire. Histoire des armées françaises de terre et de mer de 1792 à 1833 (in French). Vol. 5. Paris: Delloye.
- Ilari, Virgilio; Crociari, Piero (2015) [2010]. L'Armata italiana di Lord Bentinck 1812-1816 (in Italian). Soldiershop. ISBN 978-8-89-915819-4 – via www.mondadoristore.it.
- Johnston, Robert Matteson (1904). The Napoleonic Empire in Southern Italy and the Rise of the Secret Societies. Macmillan and Company, limited.
- Nafziger, George F.; Gioannini, Marco (2002). The defense of the Napoleonic kingdom of Northern Italy, 1813-1814. Westport, Conn.: Praeger. ISBN 978-0-313-07531-5.* Rath, Reuben John (1941). The Fall of the Napoleonic Kingdom of Italy, 1814. New York: Columbia University Press. OCLC 981109145.
- Smith, Digby (1998). The Napoleonic Wars Data Book. London: Greenhill. ISBN 1-85367-276-9.
- Ufficio storico del Comando di Stato Maggiore italiano (1914). Gli italiani in Germania nel 1813 (in Italian). Città di Castello: Unione arti grafiche.
- Vignolle, Martin (1817). Précis historique des opérations militaires de l'Armée d'Italie en 1813 et 1814, par le Chef de l'État-Major-Général de cette armée (M. de V.) (in French). Paris: Chez Barrois l'aîné, Libraire – via Gallica.
- von Helfert, Joseph Alexander (1894). La caduta della dominazione francese nell'alta Italia e la congiura militare bresciano-milanese nel 1814 (in Italian). Bologna: Zanichelli.
- von Welden, Ludwig (1853). Der Krieg der Oesterreicher in Italien gegen die Franzosen in den Jahren 1813 & 1814 (in German). Graz: Damian und Geroges Universitätes Buchhandlung.
- Weil, Maurice-Henri (1902a). Le Prince Eugène et Murat 1813-1814 (in French). Vol. 1. Paris: Albert Pontemoing Editeur.
- Weil, Maurice-Henri (1902b). Le Prince Eugène et Murat 1813-1814 (in French). Vol. 2. Paris: Albert Pontemoing Editeur.
- Weil, Maurice-Henri (1902c). Le Prince Eugène et Murat 1813-1814 (in French). Vol. 3. Paris: Albert Pontemoing Editeur.
- Weil, Maurice-Henri (1902d). Le Prince Eugène et Murat 1813-1814 (in French). Vol. 4. Paris: Albert Pontemoing Editeur.
