= Marzio Mastrilli =

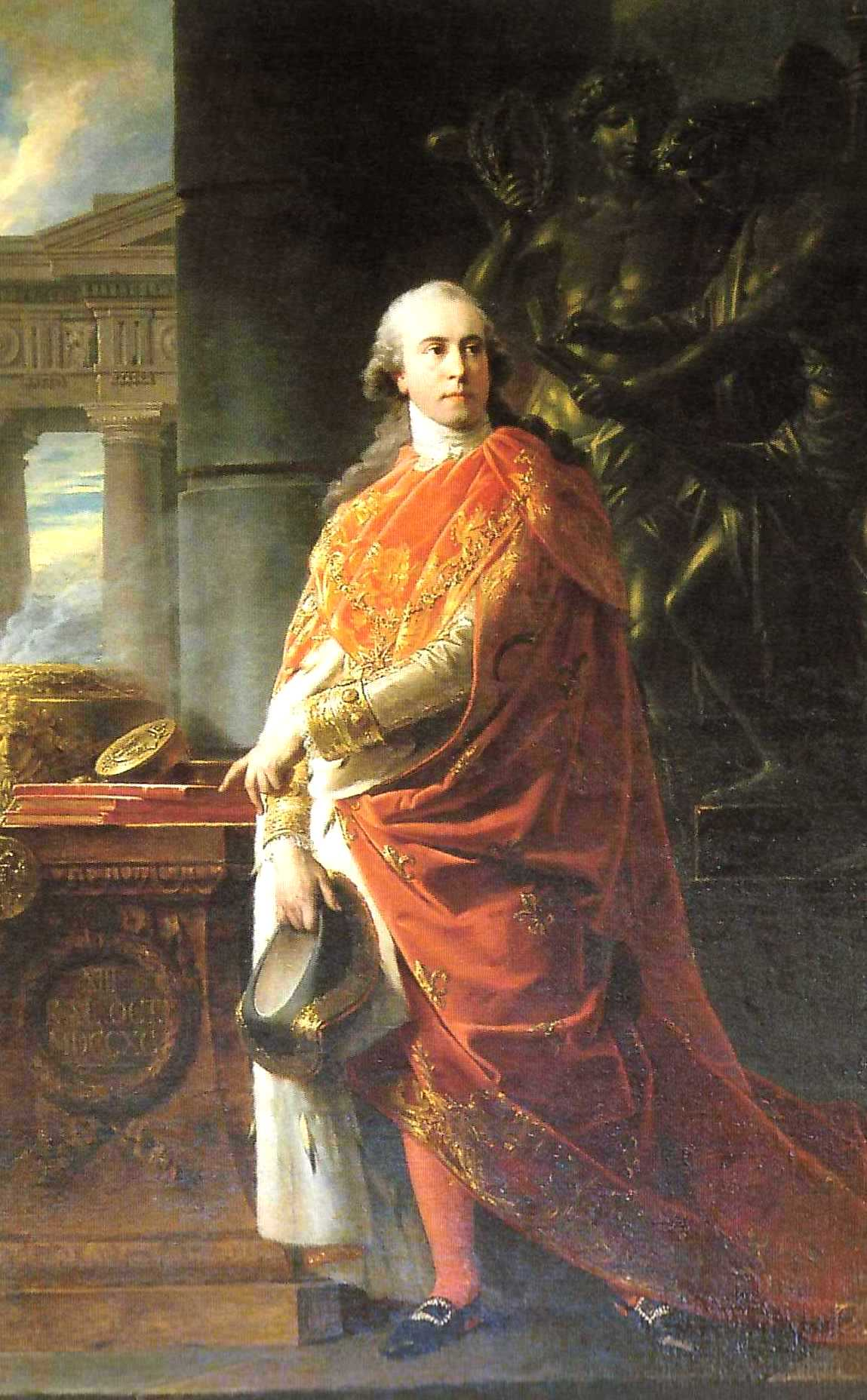
Mastrilli as a knight of the Order of Saint Januarius, painted 19 September 1790 by Heinrich Füger. Now in the Museo nazionale di San Martino in Naples.

Marzio Mastrilli (6 September 1753 – 4 February 1833), Marquis of Gallo (marchese di Gallo), was a Neapolitan nobleman, diplomat and statesman. The second son of Mario, Duke of Marigliano, and Giovanna Caracciolo di Capriglia, he was born at the castle of Ponticchio, near Nola. As per family custom, he received the secundogeniture of the small marquisate of Gallo. Only in 1813 did King Joachim Murat raise his title to Duke of Gallo (duca di Gallo) and make it hereditary.

In 1801 Mastrilli married his niece, Maddalena, daughter of his brother Giovanni, in Naples. She died on 4 January 1812, a victim of several stillbirths. In 1813 Mastrilli married Maria Luisa Colonna, daughter of Andrea, Prince of Stigliano, who bore him heirs. He died at Naples; his mémoires were finally published by Benedetto Maresca in 1888 under the title Le Memorie del duca di Gallo.

== Sources ==
- Sperber, Vladimiro (2008). "Mastrilli, Marzio". Dizionario Biografico degli Italiani. Vol. 72. Rome: Istituto dell'Enciclopedia Italiana.
