= Battle of Carpi (1815) =

1815 battle during the Neapolitan War

- Part of the Neapolitan War
Date	10 April 1815
Location	Carpi, present-day Italy 44.784361°N 10.879572°E
Result	Austrian victory

Belligerents
Austrian Empire	Kingdom of Naples

Commanders and leaders
(Austrian Empire) Frederick Bianchi	(Kingdom of Naples) Guglielmo Pepe

Strength
2,500	5,000

Casualties and losses
116 killed or wounded	~1,000 killed or wounded 612 captured
- Location within Europe

The Battle of Carpi took place during the Neapolitan War between a brigade of Neapolitan soldiers under the command of Guglielmo Pepe and an Austrian force under the command of Baron Frimont. The battle took place in the town of Carpi and resulted in an Austrian victory, with the Neapolitans being driven from the town.

== Battle ==
After Murat, the King of Naples was defeated at the Battle of Occhiobello, the Neapolitan advance was stopped on the banks of the Po River. From here, the Austrians launched a counterattack against the Neapolitan position in northern Italy. A corps under the command of Bianchi was ordered to march to the Neapolitan position around Modena and drive the Neapolitans out of the duchy. Half of Bianchi's corps marched on the town of Carpi, whilst the other half were sent to cut off the Neapolitan line of retreat.

The Austrians reached Carpi on 10 April, opening with an artillery barrage on the town's north gate. However, the Austrian column came through the south gate, surprising the Neapolitan garrison of 5,000 men commanded by Guglielmo Pepe and crushing any Neapolitan opposition. Having already received news of the defeat at Occhiobello, the Neapolitan morale crumbled and most of the surviving garrison deserted after the battle. Meanwhile, Michele Carascosa, who was in command of all the Neapolitan forces in the Duchy of Modena, realised the remaining troops were in danger of being surrounded, and ordered a general retreat from the area.

== Citations ==
Preceded by Battle of Occhiobello	Napoleonic Wars; Battle of Carpi (1815)	Succeeded by Battle of Casaglia
