= Pietro Colletta =

Neapolitan general and historian (1775–1831)

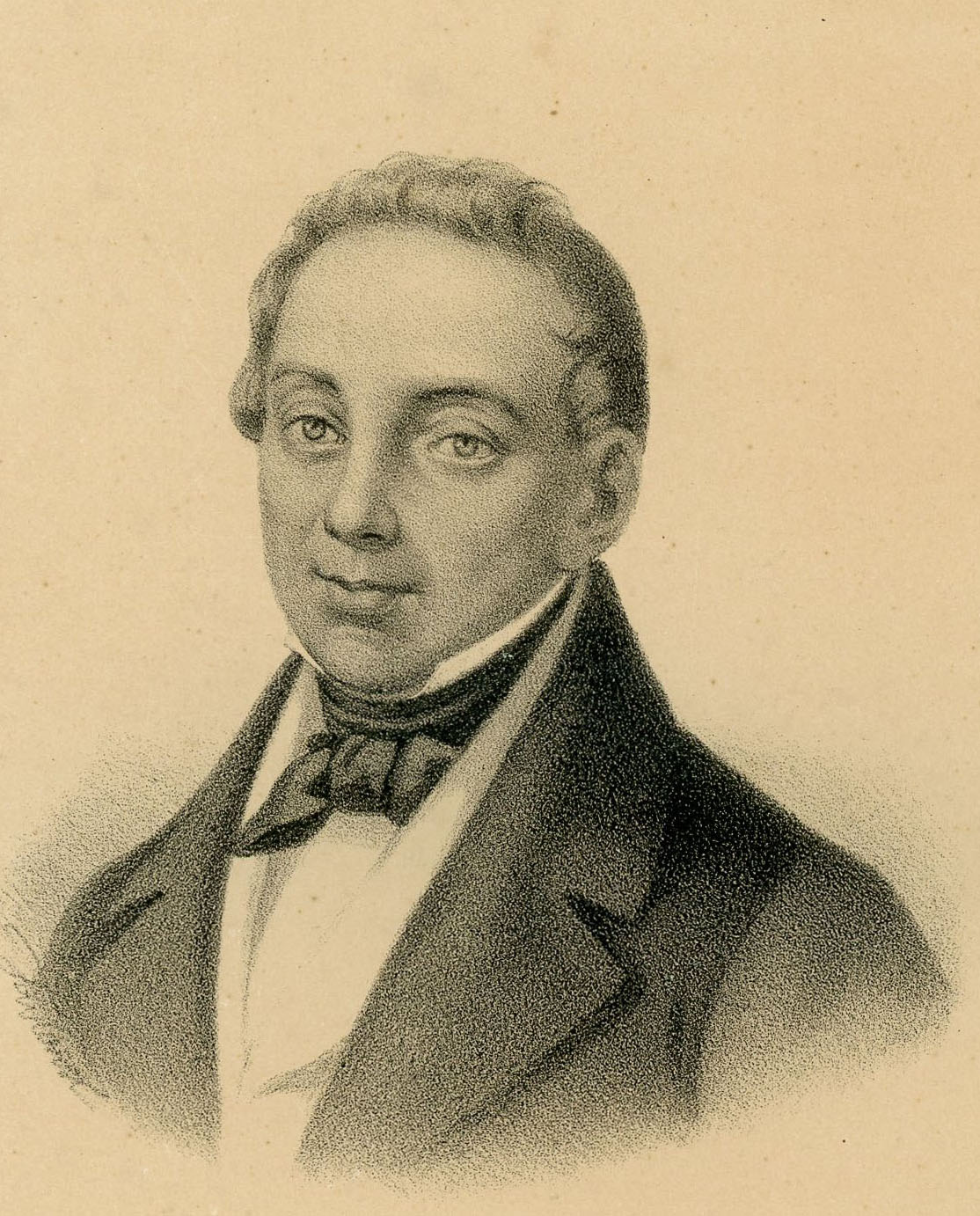
- Pietro Colletta
- Born: January 23, 1775; Naples, Kingdom of Naples
- Died: 11 November 1831 (aged 56); Florence, Grand Duchy of Tuscany
- Education: Nunziatella Military School
- Spouse: Bettina Gaston (m. 1808; died 1813)
- Military career
- Allegiance: Kingdom of Naples; Parthenopaean Republic; Kingdom of Naples (Napoleonic); Kingdom of the Two Sicilies
- Branch: Artillery
- Service years: 1796–1821
- Rank: Divisional general
- Conflicts: War of the Second Coalition; Napoleonic Wars; Siege of Gaeta; Invasion of Capri; Italian Campaign of 1813-1814; Neapolitan War; Battle of the Panaro; Battle of Occhiobello; Battle of Tolentino; Battle of Rieti

Pietro Colletta (January 23, 1775 – November 11, 1831) was a Neapolitan general and historian.

== Biography ==
Colletta was born in Naples. He entered the Neapolitan artillery in 1796 and took part in the campaign against the French in 1798. On the entry of the French into the Kingdom of Naples and the establishment of the Parthenopaean Republic (1799), Colletta adhered to the new government. When the Bourbon king Ferdinand IV reconquered the city, Colletta was thrown into prison and only escaped the death penalty by means of judiciously administered bribes. Turned out of the army, he became a civil engineer. When the Bourbons were expelled a second time in 1806 and Joseph Bonaparte seized the throne of Naples, he was reinstated in his rank and served in the expedition against the brigands and rebels of Calabria.

In 1812, Colletta was promoted to general, and made director of roads and bridges. He served under Joachim Murat and fought the Austrians at the Battle of the Panaro in 1815. On the restoration of Ferdinand, Colletta was permitted to retain his rank in the army, and was given command of the Salerno division. At the outbreak of the revolution of 1820 the king called him to his councils, and, when the constitution had been granted, Colletta was sent to put down the separatist rising in Sicily, which he did with great severity.

He fought in the constitutionalist army against the Austrians at Rieti (March 7, 1821). On the re-establishment of autocracy, he was arrested and imprisoned for three months by order of the Prince of Canosa, the chief of police and his particular enemy. He would have been executed had not the Austrians intervened in his favour, and he was exiled instead to Brünn in Moravia. In 1823, he was permitted to settle in Florence, where he spent the rest of his days engaged on his Storia del reame di Napoli.

== Works ==
- Pochi fatti su Gioacchino Murat. Naples: presso la Società tipografica. 1820.
- Storia del reame di Napoli dal 1734 sino al 1825, Capolago: Tipografia Elvetica, 1834 (vol. I, vol. II, vol. III, vol. IV). English translation by Susan Horner as History of the Kingdom of Naples, 1734–1825 (with a supplementary chapter 1825–1856), Edinburgh: T. Constable, 1858 (vol. I, vol. II)
- Storia della campagna d'Italia del 1815: opera postuma. Turin: Gianini e Fiore. 1847.
- Cenno storico intorno alla rivoluzione napoletana del 1820. Naples. 1848.

His Storia del reame di Napoli dal 1734 sino al 1825 (first published in 1834), which deals with the reigns of Charles III and Ferdinand IV (1734–1825), is still the standard work for that period, but its value is somewhat diminished by the authors bitterness against his opponents and the fact that he does not provide references for his statements, many of which are based on his recollection of documents seen, but not available at the time of writing. Still, having been an actor in many of the events recorded, he is on the whole accurate and trustworthy.

== Bibliography ==
- Scirocco, Alfonso (1981). "COLLETTA, Pietro". Dizionario Biografico degli Italiani (in Italian). Vol. 25: Chinzer–Cirni. Rome: Istituto dell'Enciclopedia Italiana. ISBN 978-88-12-00032-6.
- Palermo, F. (1856). "Pietro Colletta: uomo di stato e scrittore". Archivio Storico Italiano. 3 (1): 61–78. JSTOR 44454474.
- Natta, Alessandro (1948). "Il moderatismo di Pietro Colletta". Archivio Storico Italiano. 3 (3): 300–314. JSTOR 26046722.
