= Battle of Ronco =

1815 battle during the Neapolitan War

- Part of the Neapolitan War
Date	21 April 1815
Location	Ronco, present-day Italy 44°12′12.58″N 12°5′12.20″E
Result	Austrian victory

Belligerents
Austrian Empire	Kingdom of Naples

Commanders and leaders
(Austrian Empire) Adam Albert von Neipperg	(Kingdom of Naples) Joachim Murat

Strength
3,000	8,000

Casualties and losses
150 killed or wounded	1,000 killed or wounded
- Location within Europe

The Battle of Ronco took place during the Neapolitan War on 21 April 1815 in the village of Ronco, just south of Forlì. The main Neapolitan army, retreating following the disaster at the Battle of Occhiobello, was being pursued by an Austrian corps under the command of Adam Albert von Neipperg. The Neapolitans, commanded by their king, Joachim Murat, turned to check the Austrians at the Ronco River. The Neapolitans rear guard was defeated by a smaller advanced Austrian force, compelling Murat to retreat further south to the Savio River. The Austrians suffered light casualties, whereas nearly 1,000 Neapolitans were killed or wounded and more deserted Murat altogether.

== Citations ==
Preceded by Battle of Casaglia	Napoleonic Wars; Battle of Ronco	Succeeded by Battle of Cesenatico
