= Battle of Cesenatico =

1815 battle during the Neapolitan War

- Part of the Neapolitan War
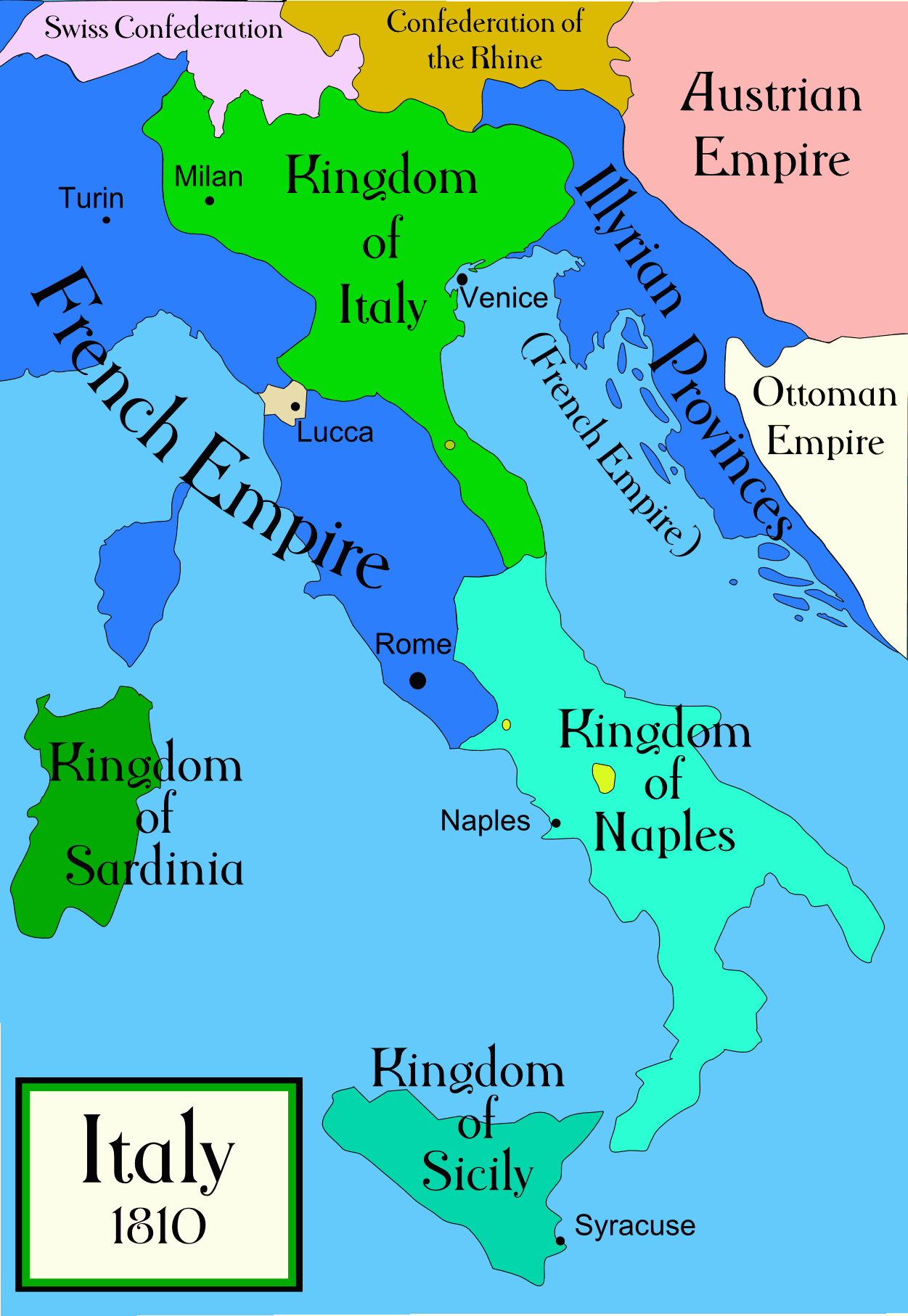
- Political map of Italy in the years around 1810
Date	23 April 1815
Location	Cesenatico, present-day Italy 44°11′56.44″N 12°24′5.62″E
Result	Austrian victory

Belligerents
Austrian Empire	Kingdom of Naples

Commanders and leaders
(Austrian Empire) Major Pirquet	(Kingdom of Naples) General Neapolitani

Strength
600	3,000

Casualties and losses
50 killed or wounded	300 killed or wounded 200 captured
- Location within Europe

The Battle of Cesenatico was a minor battle in the Neapolitan War that took place on 23 April 1815 in the town of Cesenatico on Adriatic coast.

The main Neapolitan army, commanded by their king, Joachim Murat, was retreating to their original headquarters in Ancona following a string a defeats in northern Italy. The Neapolitans were being pursued by an Austrian corps under the command of Adam Albert von Neipperg. During the evening of the 23 April, while a Neapolitan garrison of 3,000 men were stationed in the town, a small force of 600 Austrians hussars and jägers rushed the single stone bridge into the town. In the ensuing fighting, the Austrians brought out 200 prisoners with only minor casualties while inflicting moderate casualties on the garrison.

The following day, the rest of the Austrian advanced guard arrived at the town to find the Neapolitans had already left during the night.

== Citations ==
Preceded by Battle of Ronco	Napoleonic Wars; Battle of Cesenatico	Succeeded by Battle of Pesaro
