= Charles Leclerc de Landremont =

French general (1739-1818)

Charles Hyacinthe Leclerc de Landremont
- Born: 21 August 1739; Fénétrange, Moselle, France
- Died: 26 September 1818 (aged 79) Nancy, France
- Branch: Cavalry, Army of the Rhine
- Service years: 1759 – 1796
- Rank: Divisional general
- Commands: Army of the Rhine
- Awards: Order of Saint Louis
- Memorials: Name is inscribed under the Arc de Triomphe

Charles Hyacinthe Leclerc de Landremont (21 August 1739 – 26 September 1818) was the commander in chief of the Rhine in 1793 during the French Revolution. He was also a descendant of the painter Jean LeClerc.

== Biography ==
=== His family ===
Leclerc de Landremont was the son of cavalry captain Joseph Leclerc de Landremont and Marie Anne de Morlot. Landremont became a squire in 1789 and a count in 1795. He is the descendant of the painter Jean Le Clerc.

=== Before the French revolution ===
Leclerc first joined the army on 18 April 1759 as a dragoon in the 17th Schomberg regiment before being promoted to cornet on 23 August 1760. He was wounded and taken prisoner after the Battle of Bidingen on 2 March 1761. Upon release he was made second lieutenant on 3 October 1761, before being made first lieutenant in December 1763 and captain on 5 May 1772. On 5 April 1780 he was made captain-commandant of the Schomberg dragoons regimentstationes in Mirecourt. On 16 January 1785 he was made a knight of Saint Louis and he became a squadron leader on 1 May 1788.

=== Officer of the Rhine ===
On 23 November 1791 he was made lieutenant-colonel, and then colonel on 12 July 1792, and finally Maréchal de camp to the l'armée de la Moselle on 5 October 1792.

=== Commander in chief of the Rhine army ===
On 18 August 1793 he was appointed acting commander in chief of the Rhine army, replacing Alexandre de Beauharnais, who had fallen ill. His post was confirmed 5 days later.

He then created Hussards du corps des Partisans de l'Armée du Rhin, a body of hussars.

=== Arrest and imprisonment ===
On 29 September 1793 he was suspended and then arrested before being taken to Prison de l'Abbaye, without being informed why. Antoine Guillaume Delmas took on his role in the defence of Landau and refused to replace him. Landremont was then charged with treason.

In reality he had been falsely accused by his superiors. Maximilien Robespierre considered him dangerous. He notes the following about Landremont: "He is noble, very noble, filled with the favours of a tyrant", and who "has done nothing of the excellent troops he commands". Robespierre also accused him of being a "treacherous general".

He was released from prison upon the downfall of Robespierre on 27 July 1794. He was appointed, on 24 May 1795, as inspector general of the mounted troops and he returned to the 17th military division in Paris.

== Honours ==
His name is among those inscribed on the Arc de Triomphe.

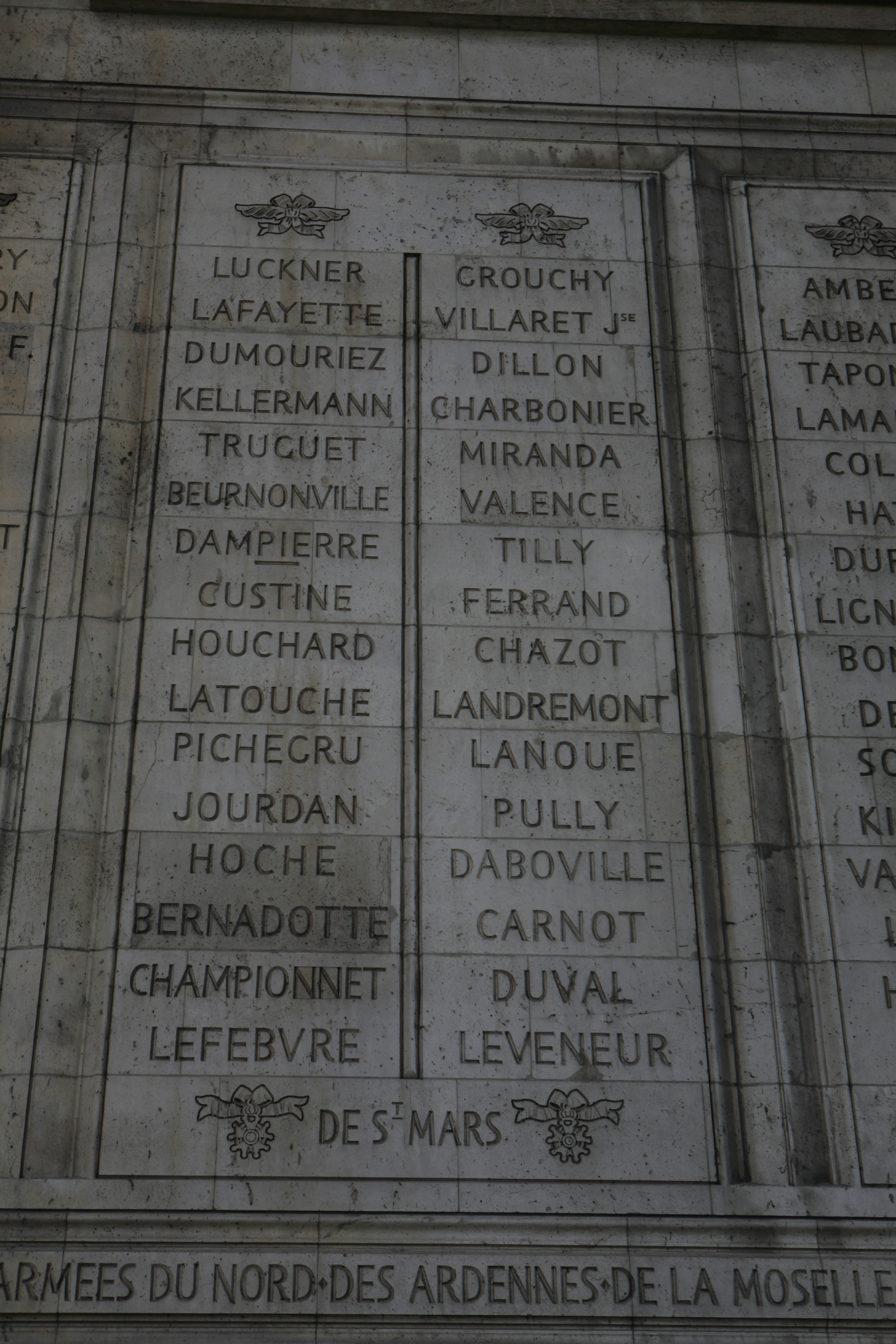
The names on the third and fourth columns of the Arc de Triomphe. Landremont's name can be found on the right, the tenth one down.
