= Fénétrange =

- Commune
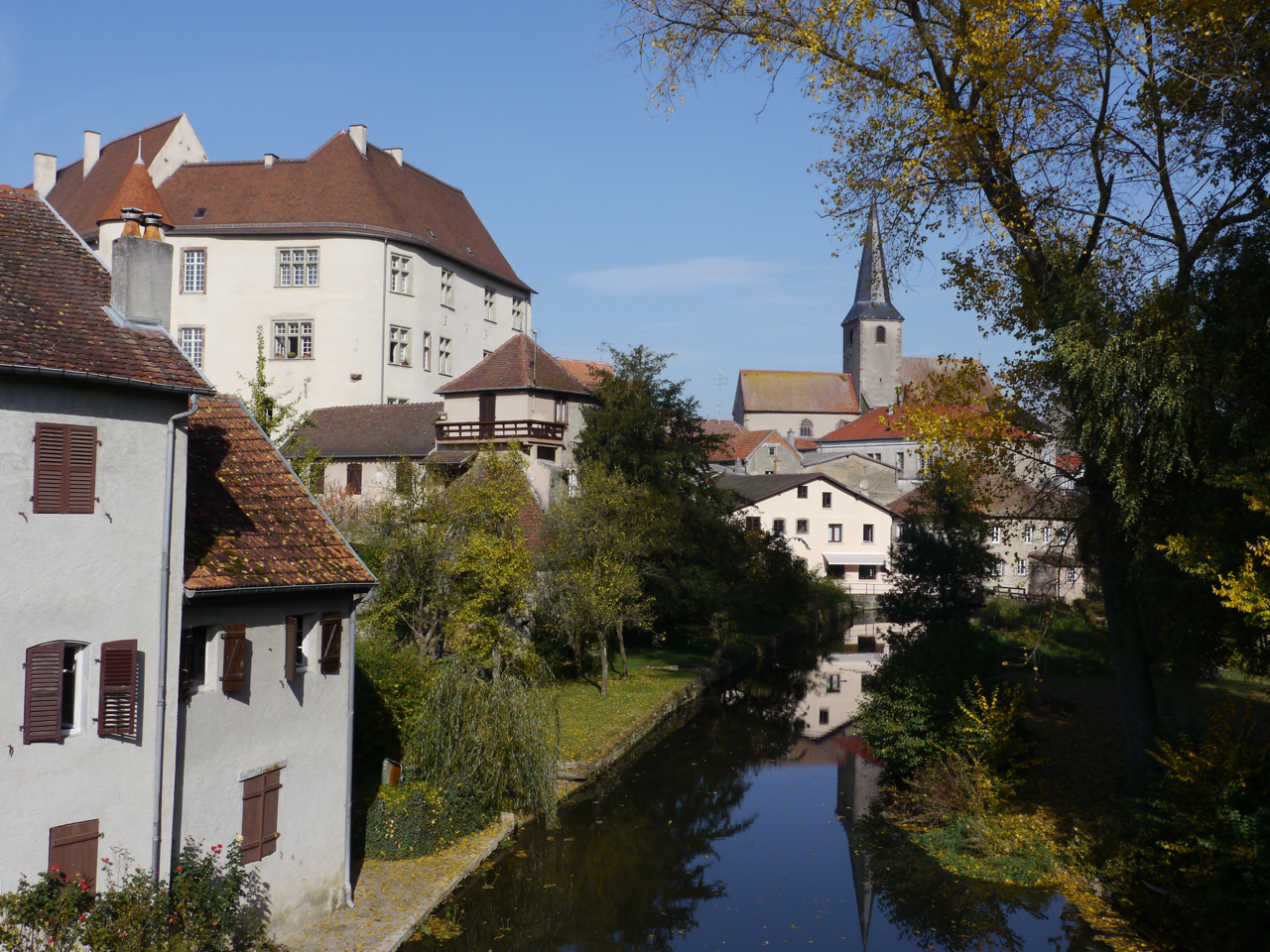
- The chateau overlooking the Saar river in Fénétrange

- Coat of arms
- Location of Fénétrange
- Location within France Location within Grand Est
- Coordinates: 48°50′47″N 7°01′14″E
- Country: France
- Region: Grand Est
- Department: Moselle
- Arrondissement: Sarrebourg-Château-Salins
- Canton: Sarrebourg

Government
  - Mayor (2020–2026): Benoît Piatkowski
- Area^{1}: 14.49 km^{2} (5.59 sq mi)
- Elevation: 240 m (790 ft)
- Highest elevation: 317 m (1,040 ft)
- Lowest elevation: 227 m (745 ft)
- Population (2023): 639
  - Density: 44.1/km^{2} (114/sq mi)
- Time zone: UTC+01:00 (CET)
  - Summer (DST): UTC+02:00 (CEST)
- INSEE/Postal code: 57210 /57930
- ^{1} French Land Register data, which excludes lakes, ponds, glaciers > 1 km^{2} (0.386 sq mi or 247 acres) and river estuaries.

Fénétrange (French pronunciation: [fenetʁɑ̃ʒ]; German: Finstingen, Lorraine Franconian: Finschtinge) is a commune in the Moselle department in Grand Est in north-eastern France.

== Geography ==
Fénétrange is located near the border between the Moselle department and the Alsace bossue. The river Saar flows through Fénétrange. The municipality is part of the Lorraine regional natural park.

== Etymology ==
The name refers to "dwellings on the edge of a bend". Its Latin name is Philestangia. It was Germanised into Vinstingen, and francized into Fénétrange.

=== Previous names ===
Filestengas (10th century), Filistenges et Vinstringen (1070), Philistingis (1136), Phylestanges (1222), Finstingen (1323), Vinstingen (1328), Vinstinga (1340), Fenestranges (1433), Phinstingen (1558), Vinstringium (1675), Fénétrange (1793), Fénestrange (19th century), Finstingen (1871–1918)

== History ==
The name of Fénétrange was officially mentioned for the first time on 18 September 1070. More precisely in a document authorising the abbesses of Remiremont, who partly owned the domain, to mint coins in Fénétrange, in exchange for the payment of a fee.

In 1224, Merbode de Malberg became the first lord of Fénétrange.

During the Middle-Age, it used to be a fortified town reputed to be impregnable.

== Sights ==
- The Fénétrange castle, built during the Middle Age. It was later renovated during the 18th century. The building contains a medieval kitchen, a well, spiral stairs labelled "monument historique". It also contains a catholic gothic chapel constructed in 1584.
- The Saint-Rémy gothic collegiate church. It was labelled "monument historique" in 1930.
- The former synagogue
- The Lutheran Church
- The remains of the ramparts
- The former Bailiff's House
- The "Porte de France", an ancient fortified gate
- Oriel windows, located 78, rue de l'Hôpital and 35, rue des Juifs are labelled "monuments historiques".
- The bridge
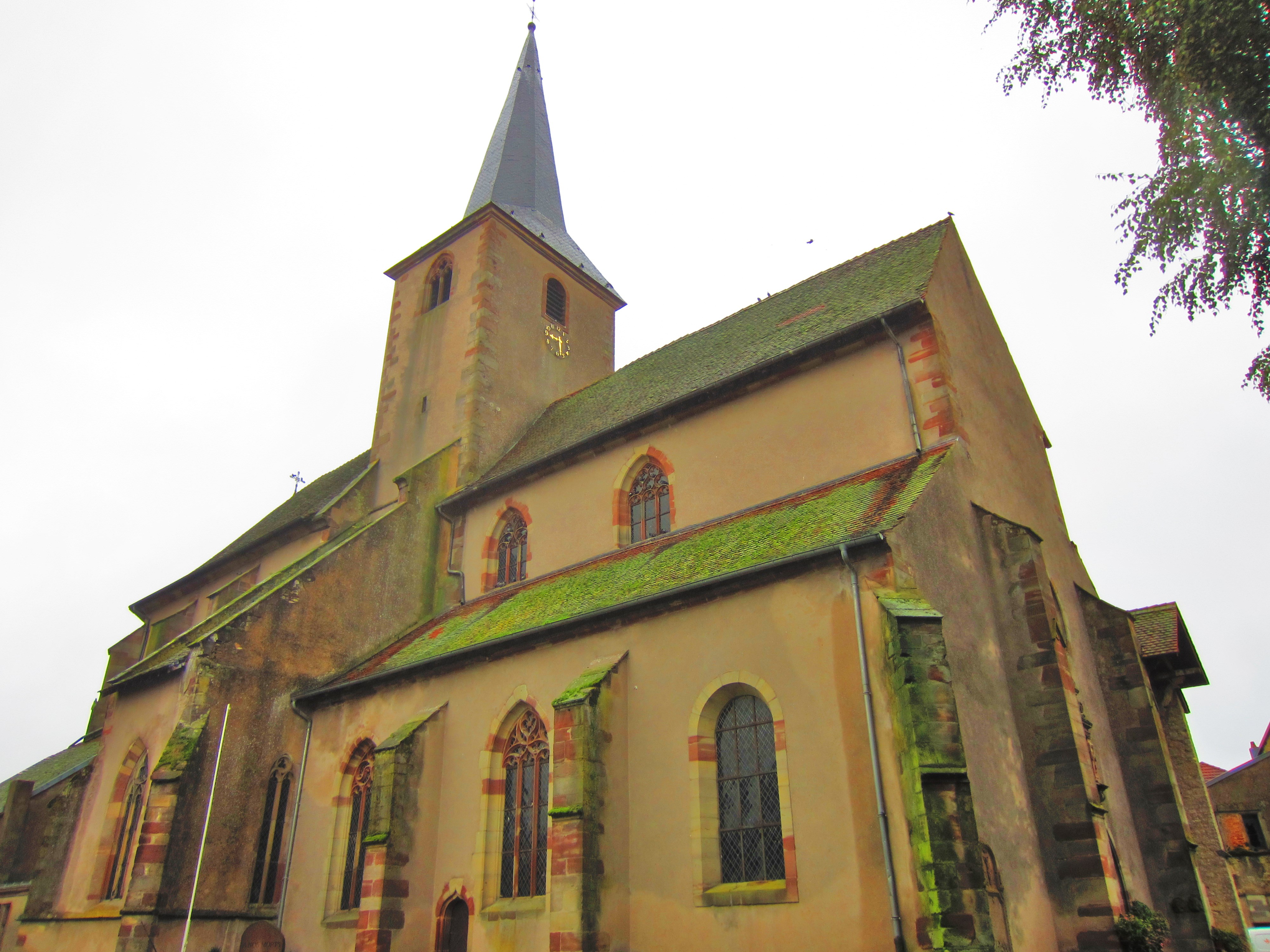
Saint-Remy Church.

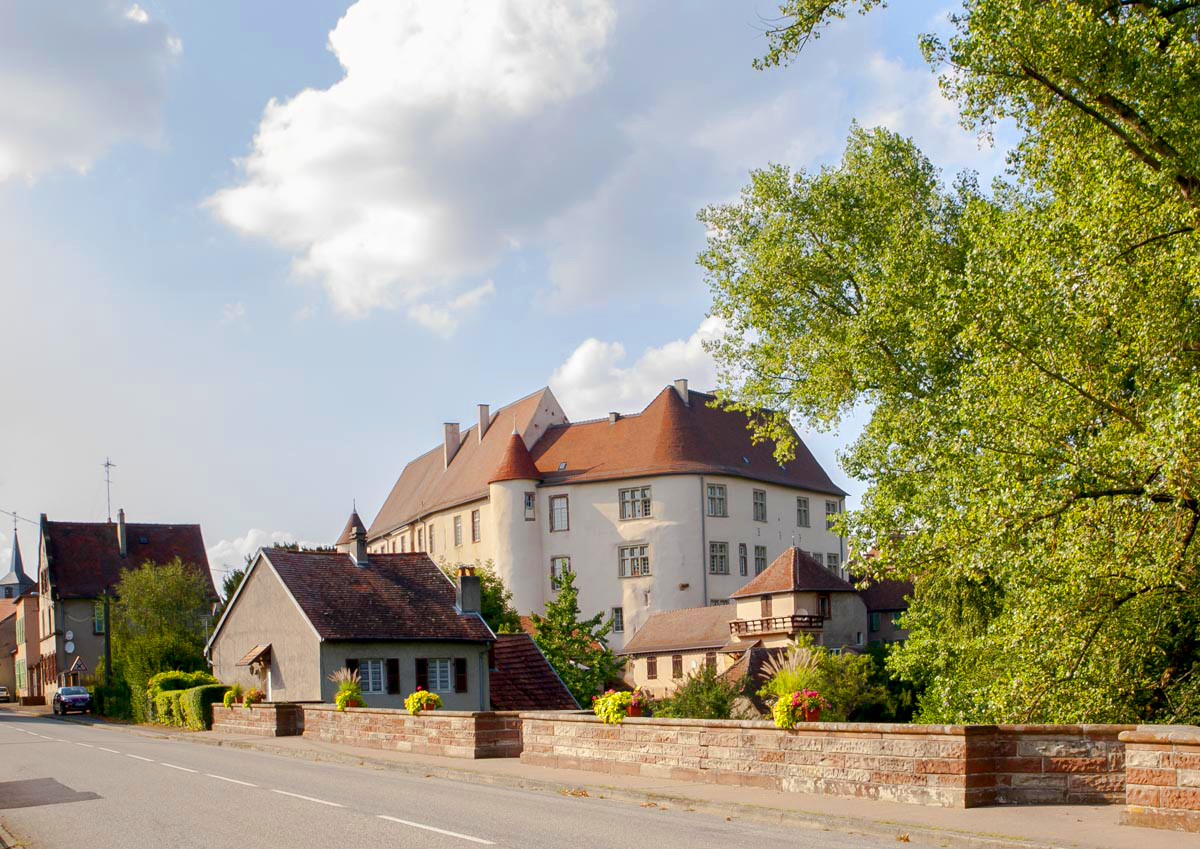
The castle

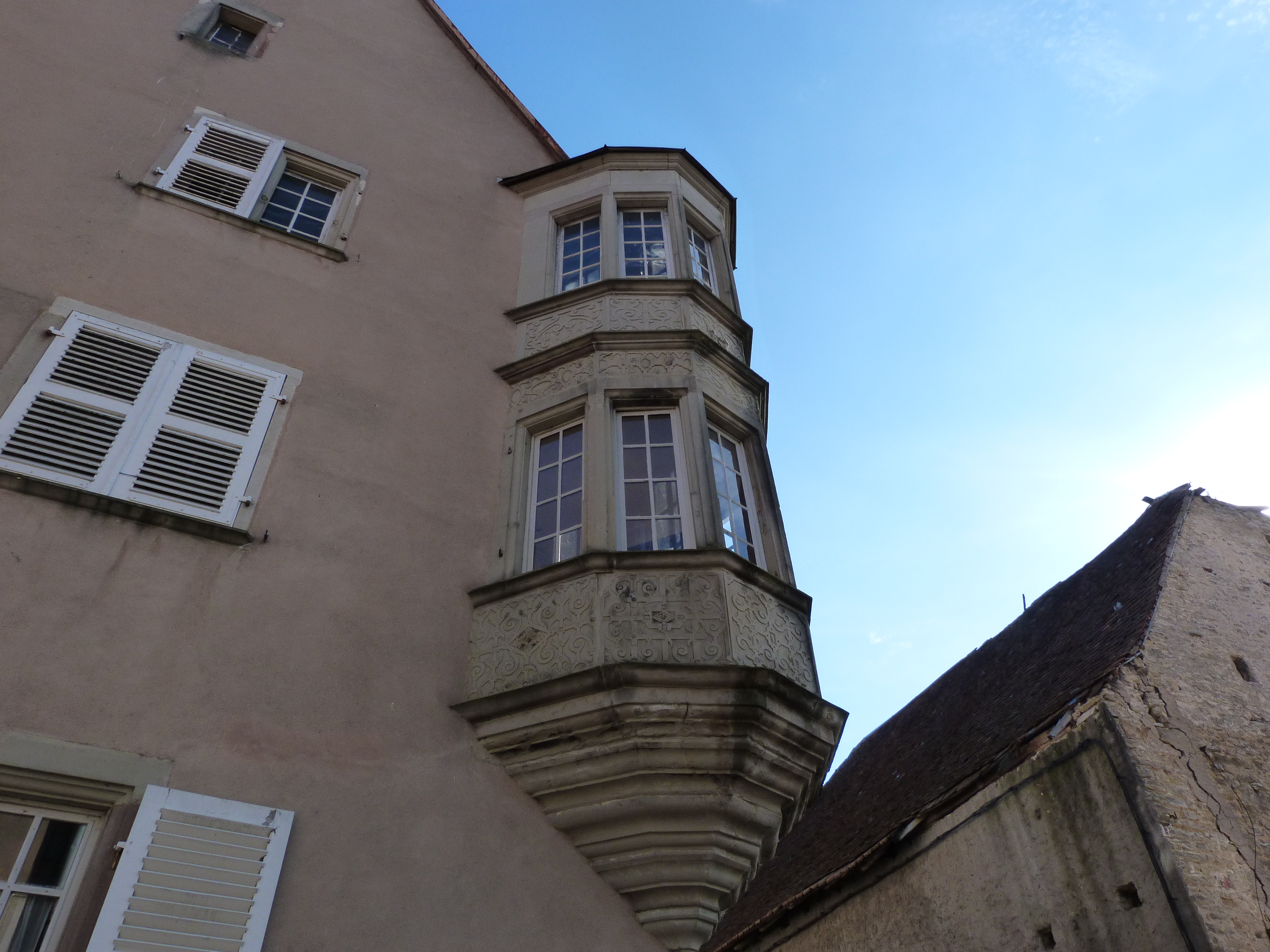
Oriel window located Rue de l'Hôpital

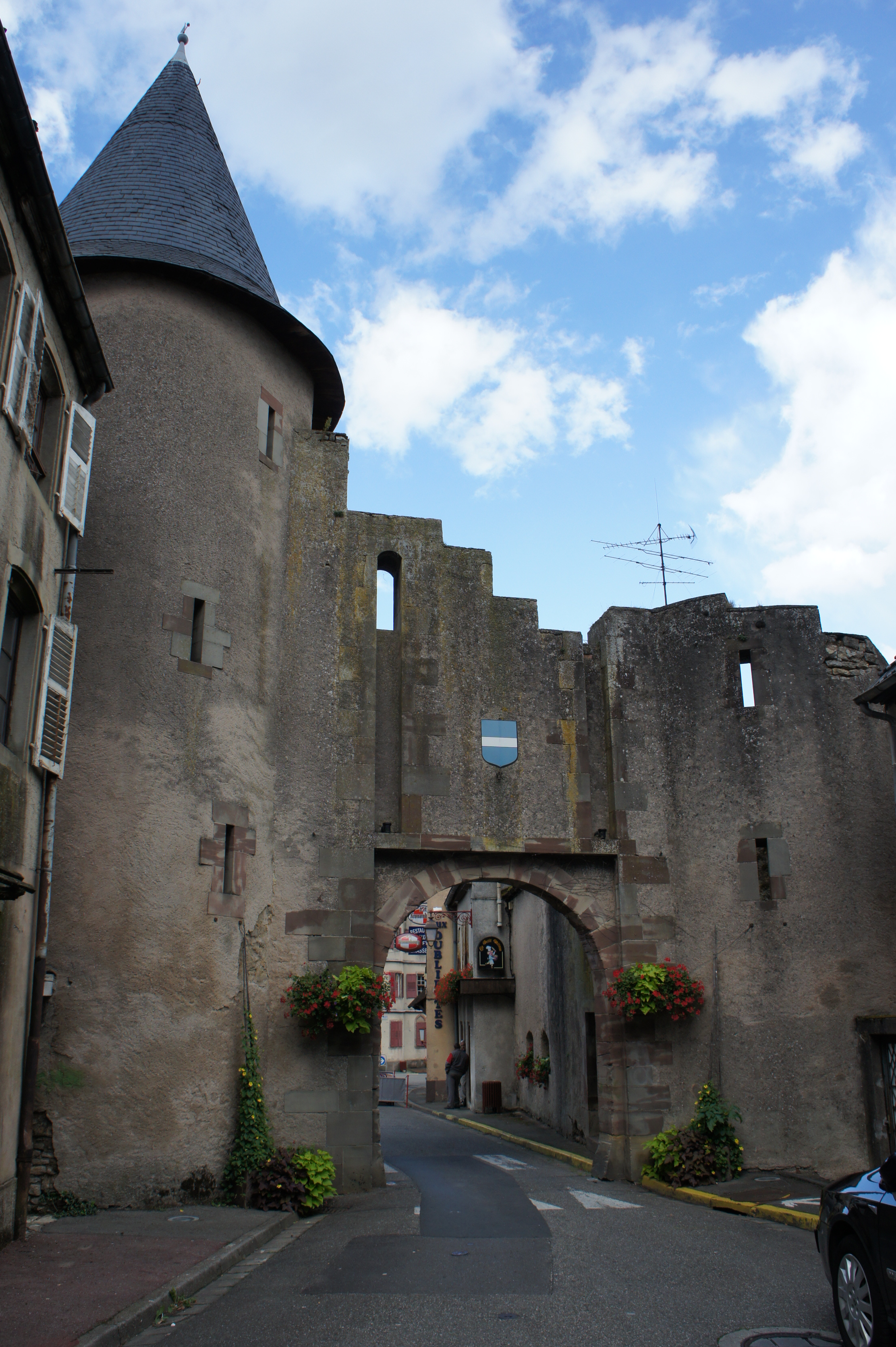
Porte de France

== Cultural events and festivities ==
Since 1978, an annual music and gastronomy festival takes place in Fénétrange. It is known as "Festival de Fénétrange, musique et gastronomie"

Fénétrange is one of the few French localities where a night watchman still exists, thus perpetuating a medieval tradition. From July to September, the visitors can follow the watchman, in his medieval attire, during his night patrol.

Every year, from late November to early January, several winter festivities occur in Fénétrange. One of them, is the traditional Christmas market.

== Notable people ==
=== Notable people born in Fénétrange ===
- Johann Maria Philipp Frimont (1759–1831) a general of the Austrian Empire
- Charles Hyacinthe Leclerc de Landremont (1739–1818) commander in chief of the Army of the Rhine during the French Revolution
- Ernst Bogislaw von Croÿ (1620–1684) the last duke of Pomerania

=== Notable people related to Fénétrange ===
- Charles Philippe de Croÿ (1549–1613) a Prince of the Holy Empire and a military as well as a politician from the Southern Netherlands. He became Baron of Fénétrange when he married Diane de Dommartin.
- Marcel Dassault (1892–1986) a French engineer and industrialist, whose family originally came from Fénétrange
- Johann Michael Moscherosch (1601–1669) a German statesman, writer and one of Fénétrange's former bailiffs.

== See also ==
- Communes of the Moselle department
- Parc naturel régional de Lorraine
