= Battle of the Panaro =

1815 battle during the Neapolitan War

- Part of the Neapolitan War
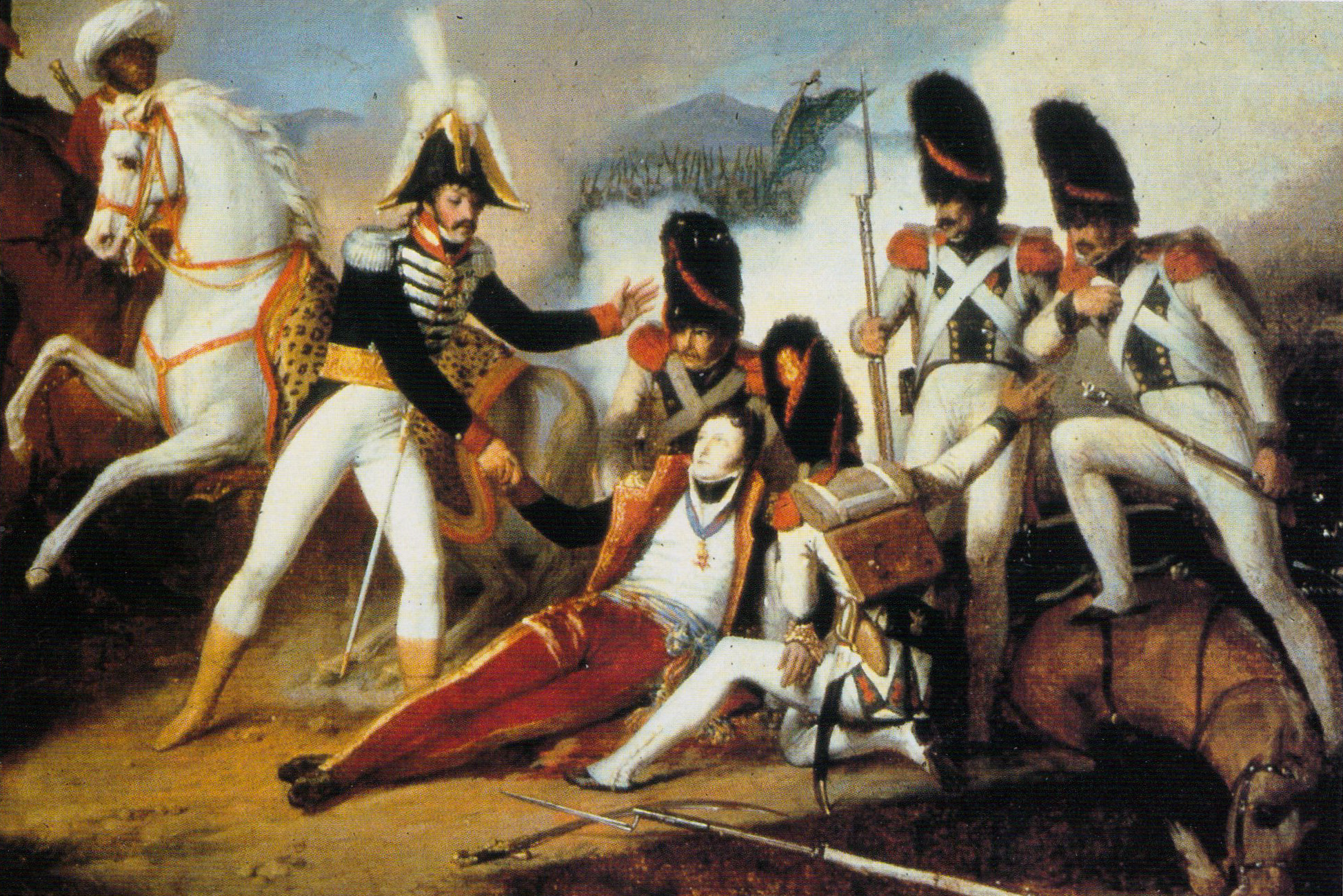
- Joachim Murat helps the wounded general Filangieri after the battle.
Date	3 April 1815
Location	Castelfranco Emilia 44°37′22.71″N 10°59′50.33″E
Result	Neapolitan victory

Belligerents
Kingdom of Naples	Austrian Empire

Commanders and leaders
Joachim Murat; Michele Carrascosa; Pietro Colletta	(Austrian Empire) Frederick Bianchi

Strength
7,000	6,600

Casualties and losses
409 killed, wounded or captured	461 killed, wounded or captured
- Location within Europe

The Battle of the Panaro (or Modena or Castelfranco) was a victory for King Joachim Murat's Neapolitan forces over a smaller Austrian force under Frederick Bianchi on 3 April 1815 early in the Neapolitan War. This defeat on the banks on the Panaro River, just south of Modena forced the Austrians to retreat behind the Po River.

== Background ==
When Naples declared war on Austria, Austrian troops were still gathering in Lombardy. Only a small force of about 6,600 men commanded by General Bianchi, who was stationed in the Duchy of Modena, were in position to check the Neapolitan advance. Murat with his main army of around 40,000 men had already established a main headquarters in Ancona and were marching north. Following a minor skirmish on 30 March near Cesena, the Austrians under Bianchi fell back to a new defensive line behind the Panaro River. This allowed the Neapolitans to capture Bologna on 2 April, from where they prepared another assault on the Austrians.

== Battle ==
On 3 April, one day after capturing Bologna, a Neapolitan division under the command of Michele Carrascosa attempted to cross the Panaro. After being driven back from two other bridges, the Neapolitans finally crossed the Panaro at Castelfranco Emilia and made a sweeping charge on Bianchi's position. As heavy fighting continued in the center of the Austrian position, Murat ordered a column under General Colletta to sweep left and push on the Austrian fight flank. Outnumbered, the Austrian right flank was turned and Bianchi was compelled to sound the retreat. With more Neapolitan troops arriving from Bologna, the Austrian retreated back to their lands behind the Po River. Following the battle, Carascosa and his troops immediately occupied the major towns of the Duchy of Modena: Modena, Reggio Emilia and Carpi.

Preceded by Battle of Bayonne	Napoleonic Wars; Battle of the Panaro	Succeeded by Battle of Occhiobello
