= Battle of Rieti =

1821 battle of Italian unification

Coordinates: 42°24′N 12°52′E

Battle of Antrodoco (Rieti)
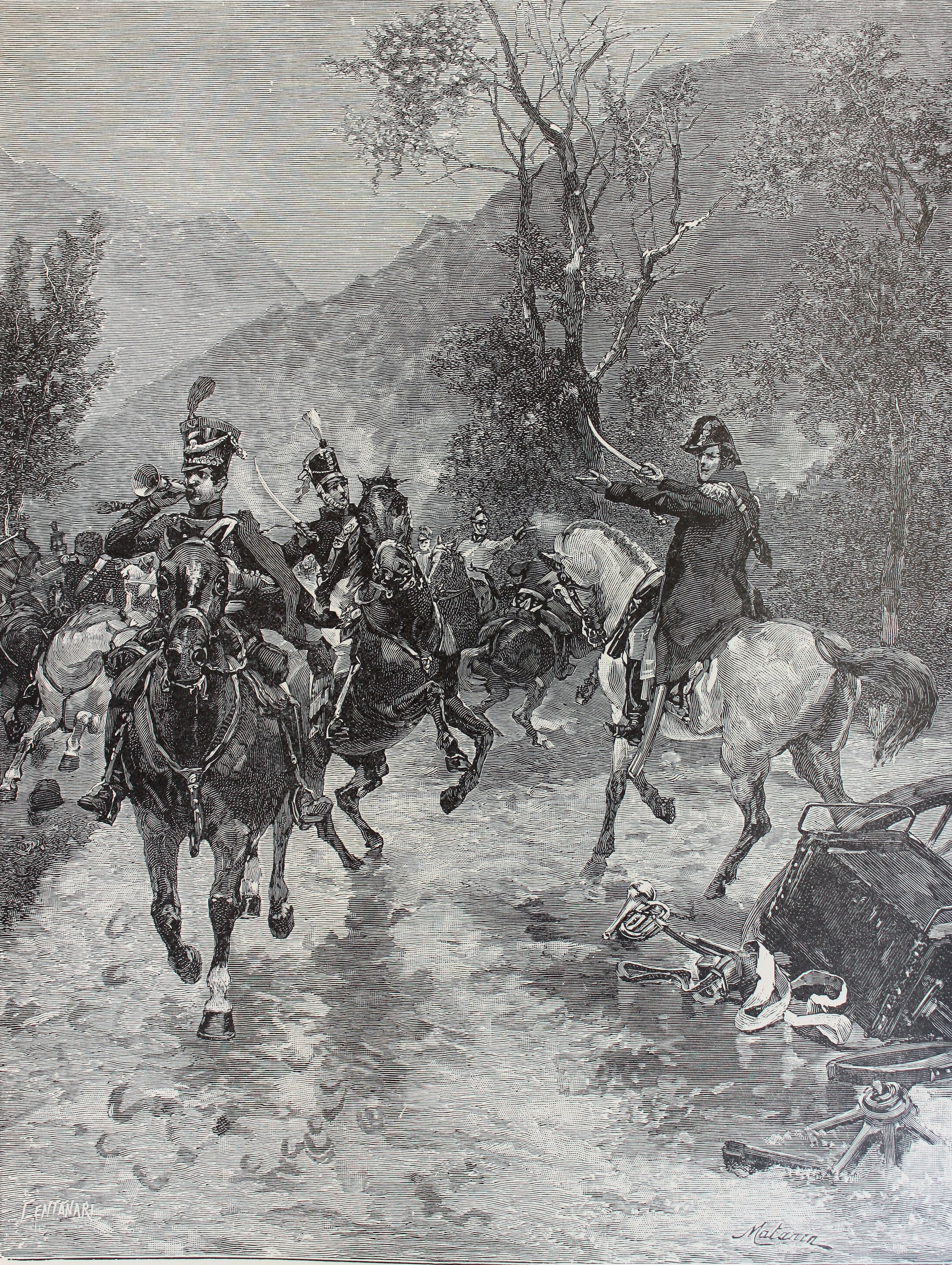
- Guglielmo Pepe at the Gole of Antrodoco
Date	7 March 1821
Location	Antrodoco-Rieti, Italy
Result	Austrian victory

Belligerents
Austrian Empire	Kingdom of the Two Sicilies

Commanders and leaders
(Austrian Empire) Johann Frimont	(Kingdom of the Two Sicilies) Guglielmo Pepe (Kingdom of the Two Sicilies) Pietro Colletta

Strength
14,500	10,000

The Battle of Antrodoco (Rieti) was fought on 7 March 1821 between Austria and Neapolitan rebels. The Austrians were victorious. The rebel Neapolitan general Guglielmo Pepe commanded a force numbering 10,000 soldiers, whilst the Austrian general Johann Frimont commanded an army of around 14,500 soldiers.

== Aftermath ==
On 24 March, the victorious Austrian army entered Naples and restored Ferdinand I of the Two Sicilies to the throne. Johann Frimont's reward from King Ferdinand was the title of the Prince of Antrodoco and a handsome sum of money, and from Emperor Francis I of Austria promotion to the rank of General of the Cavalry. After this he commanded Austrian forces in North Italy, and was called upon to crush the Carbonari revolt in the Savoyard state. He became president of the Hofkriegsrat in 1831, but would die only a few months later in Vienna.
