= Battle of Casaglia =

1815 battle during the Neapolitan War

- Part of the Neapolitan War
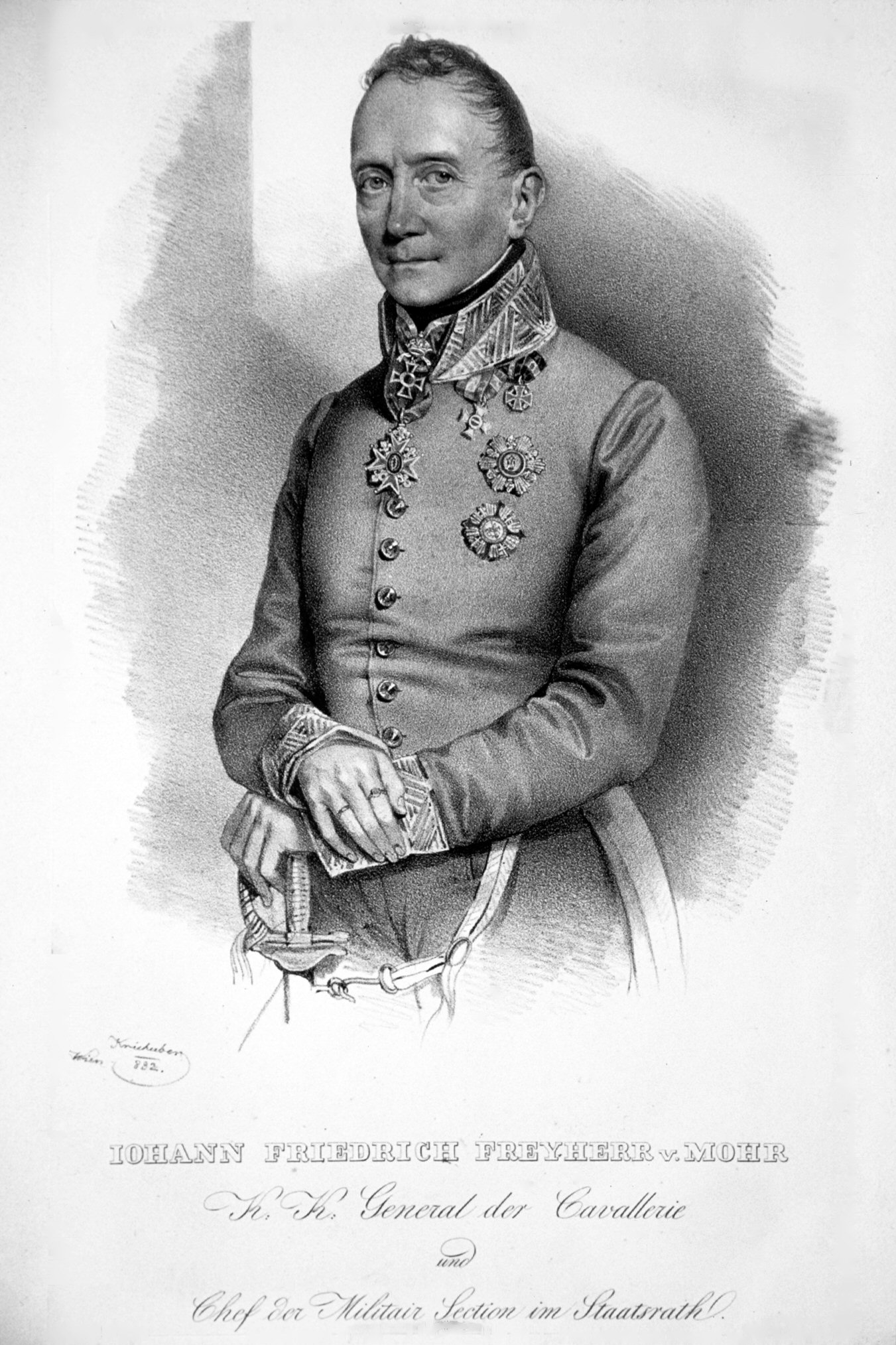
- Johann Friedrich Mohr
Date	12 April 1815
Location	Casaglia, present-day Italy 44°54′5.69″N 11°32′25.29″E
Result	Austrian victory

Belligerents
Austrian Empire	Kingdom of Naples

Commanders and leaders
(Austrian Empire) Johann Frimont (Austrian Empire) Johann Friedrich von Mohr	(Kingdom of Naples) Joachim Murat

Strength
4,500	7,000+

Casualties and losses
230 killed or wounded	~1,000 killed or wounded
- Location within Europe

The Battle of Casaglia was a part of the Neapolitan War. An Austrian force under the command of Johann Friedrich von Mohr engaged a Neapolitan force under their commander, Joachim Murat. The battle took place around the village of Casaglia, seven miles northwest of Ferrara, and resulted in the Austrians recapturing the village from Murat.

== Battle ==
After Murat was defeated at the Battle of Occhiobello, the Neapolitans stopped their advance and made a defensive line on the Po River. However, even from his new position, Murat was still able to threaten the key Austrian held city of Ferrara, which had been under attack since 7 April. The commander of the main Austrian force on the north bank of the Po, Johann Frimont, decided to break out from his bridgehead at Occhiobello and drive Murat from his position, forcing him to lift the Siege of Ferrara.

Murat had entrenched General Ambrosio's division on his right flank northwest of Ferrara, around the villages of Ravale and Casaglia. The Neapolitan garrison of Ravale was quickly routed on the morning of 12 April. On the same day, an Austrian column under the command of General Mohr, attacked a larger Neapolitan force entrenched in Casaglia. Following severe fighting in the village, the Austrians eventually broke the morale of the defenders and drove the Neapolitans from their positions by the evening. The Neapolitans suffered severe casualties as they retreated. The remainder of the force fell back on the road to Bologna with a large number deserting Murat's cause altogether. Mirandola fell the following day to the Austrians without major fighting and Murat was forced to retire from his defensive position, finally pulling his troops back from Ferrara.

== Citations ==
Preceded by Battle of Carpi (1815)	Napoleonic Wars; Battle of Casaglia	Succeeded by Battle of Ronco
