= Johann Maria Philipp Frimont =

Austrian general

Johann Maria Philipp Frimont Count of Palota, Prince of Antrodoco
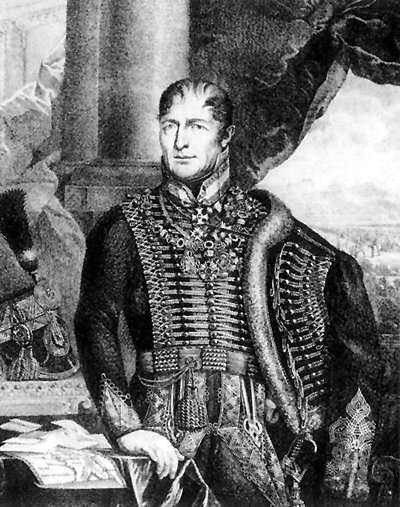
- Born: 3 February 1759; Fénétrange, Duchy of Lorraine
- Died: 26 December 1831 (aged 72); Vienna, Austria
- Military career
- Allegiance: Habsburg monarchy Austrian Empire
- Service years: 1776–1821
- Rank: General of the Cavalry
- Commands: Commander-in-Chief of the Neapolitan Theater; V Armeekorps
- Conflicts: War of the Bavarian Succession; Austro-Turkish War (1788–1791); French Revolutionary Wars; War of the First Coalition; Rhine Campaign of 1795; War of the Second Coalition; Battle of Marengo; Napoleonic Wars; War of the Third Coalition; Battle of Caldiero (1805); War of the Fifth Coalition; Battle of Sacile; Battle of Caldiero (1809); Battle of Piave River (1809); Battle of Raab (1809); French invasion of Russia; Battle of Gorodechno; War of the Sixth Coalition; Battle of Caldiero (1813); Hundred Days; Neapolitan War; Battle of Occhiobello; Battle of Casaglia; Battle of Rieti
- Awards: Military Order of Maria Theresa
- Other work: President of the Hofkriegsrat

Johann Maria Philipp Frimont, Count of Palota, Prince of Antrodoco (3 February 1759 – 26 December 1831) was an Austrian general.

Frimont was born at Fénétrange, in the Duchy of Lorraine. He entered the Austrian cavalry as a trooper in 1776, won his commission in the War of the Bavarian Succession, and took part in the Austro-Turkish War (1788–1791) and in the early campaigns of the French Revolutionary Wars, in which he frequently earned distinction.

At the Battle of Frankenthal in 1795 he won the Military Order of Maria Theresa. In the campaign of 1800 he distinguished himself greatly as a cavalry leader at Marengo (14 June), and in the next year became major-general. In the War of the Third Coalition he was again employed in Italy and won further renown by his gallantry at the Battle of Caldiero. In 1809 he again saw active service in Italy under the Archduke John in the rank of lieutenant field marshal, serving in Chasteler's Corps at 1st Sacile 15–16 April, and Caldiero (Soave). He commanded the rearguard at the Piave, but was defeated at 2nd Sacile and at Saint Daniel 11 May. He commanded the Reserve Corps at the Battle of Raab 14 June. In 1812 Frimont led the cavalry of Karl Philipp, Prince of Schwarzenberg's corps in the Russian campaign, serving at the Battle of Gorodechno (Podobna, Prujany) 12 August. He replaced Schwarzenberg as commander in January 1813.

In 1813 he commanded V Armeekorps under Hiller in Italy, serving at Caldiero 15 November. After the Treaty of Paris (1814) he became military governor in Mainz. In 1815 he was commander-in-chief of the Austrian campaign in Italy, and his army penetrated France as far as Lyon, which was entered on 11 July. During this campaign he won victories at Occhiobello 9 April and Casaglia 12 April. With the army of occupation he remained in France for some years, and in 1819 he commanded at Venice.

In 1821 he led the Austrian army which was employed against the Neapolitan Carbonari rebels, and by 24 March he had victoriously entered Naples after the Battle of Rieti 7 March. His reward from King Ferdinand I of the Two Sicilies was the title of Prince of Antrodoco and a handsome sum of money, and from Emperor Francis I of Austria the rank of general of cavalry. After this he commanded in North Italy, and led the campaign against Carbonari rebels in the Kingdom of Sardinia that same year. He became president of the Hofkriegsrat in 1831, but died a few months later at Vienna.
