= Jean LeClerc (painter) =

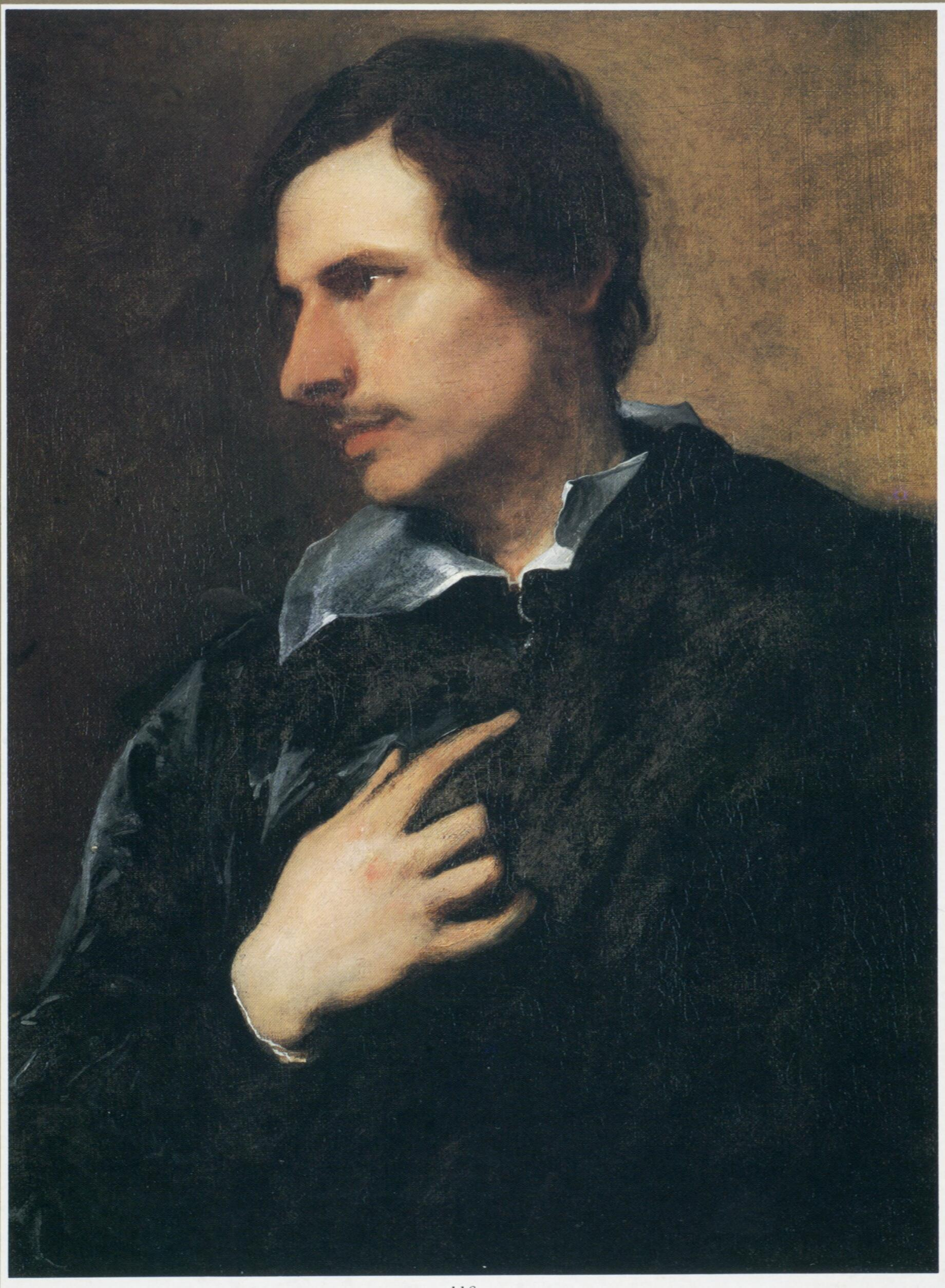
Portrait of Jean LeClerc by Anthony van Dyck

Jean LeClerc (French pronunciation: [ʒɑ̃ ləklɛʁ]; 1587/88 – buried 20 October 1633) was a 17th-century painter from the Duchy of Lorraine. His style was Baroque, or more specifically "tenebrist". Only six authenticated paintings remain of LeClerc’s work, but numerous etchings and engravings have survived.

LeClerc was born and died at Nancy. He studied with the Venetian master Carlo Saraceni. LeClerc is known for his mastery of nocturnal light effects, and the luminosity of his scenes.

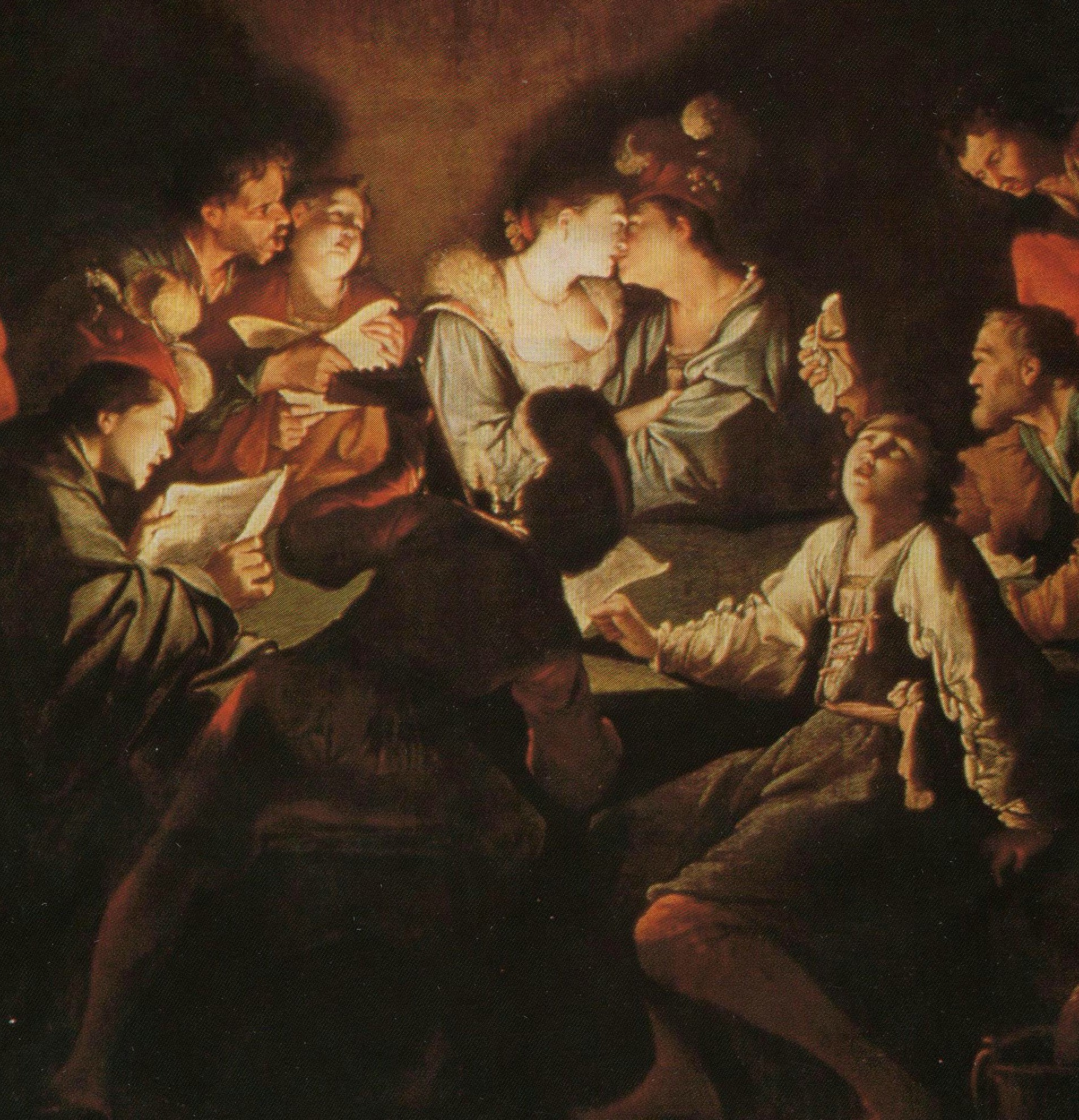
Jean LeClerc, Singers
