= Battle of Occhiobello =

1815 battle during the Neapolitan War

- Part of the Neapolitan War
Date	8–9 April 1815
Location	Occhiobello 44°54′54.80″N 11°34′46.52″E
Result	Austrian victory

Belligerents
Naples	Austrian Empire (Kingdom of Prussia) Prussia

Commanders and leaders
Joachim Murat	(Austrian Empire) Johann Frimont

Strength
25,000	10,000

Casualties and losses
2,000 killed, wounded or captured	400 killed, wounded or captured
- Location within Europe

The Battle of Occhiobello was fought on 8–9 April 1815 and was the turning point of the Neapolitan War. Joachim Murat, King of Naples was repulsed by an Austrian force under the command of Johann Frimont whilst trying to cross the bridge over the Po River at Occhiobello. Following the battle, the Austrians would not lose an engagement for the remainder of the war.

== Background ==
By March 1815, it became increasingly likely that Joachim Murat would lose the crown of Naples, which had been given to him by his brother-in-law, Napoleon Bonaparte, in 1808. After hearing news that Napoleon had escaped from exile in Elba and landed in France, Murat decided to take matters into his own hands and declared war on Austria, the greatest threat to his position as King of Naples. Following Napoleon's defeat in 1814, areas such as Lombardy and Venetia became part of the Austrian Empire and were directly ruled from Vienna.

On 30 March, hoping to start a popular uprising against the Austrians, Murat gave the Rimini Proclamation calling all Italian nationalists to war. Although there were many Italians sympathetic to his cause, fearful of the increasing Austrian influence in Italy and longing for independence, most Italians saw Murat as someone trying to save his own crown rather than a figurehead for unification. The Austrians also quickly crushed any unrest and there would be no general insurrection so long as Austrian troops were stationed in Italy. Despite this, by early April, Murat had reached the Austrian border on the Po River. Across the border in Lombardy, there were reportedly around 40,000 Italian partisans, mostly veterans of the Napoleonic Wars, waiting to join Murat's army as soon he arrived in Milan.

However, the Austrians had also been assembling troops in northern Italy. Originally intended for an invasion of southern France following Napoleon's return from exile, the Austrians troops now moved south to counter the threat Murat now posed. Realising the danger of an Italian insurrection should Murat arrive in Milan, Johann Frimont moved his headquarters to Piacenza to block Murat's direct route to Milan. By now, the Austrian numbers on the frontier and available for war swelled to nearly 50,000, vastly outnumbering the Neapolitans. With his original route now blocked, Murat was forced eastwards to Ferrara. On the 8 April, Murat made an attempt to cross the Po into Austria with the bulk of his army at the town of Occhiobello, just a few miles northwest of Ferrara.

== Battle ==
Murat chose Occhiobello as a crossing point because the bridge was only lightly defended by a small force of Austrians under the command of Johann Friedrich von Mohr. However, the majority of the Neapolitan artillery had been diverted to the Siege of Ferrara along with a significant portion of Murat's army, where the Austrian garrison was frustrating the Neapolitans. Nevertheless, Murat was still able to move on Occhiobello with around 25,000 infantry and cavalry.

Meanwhile, although the Austrians had spread their forces along their border, they had concentrated their guns at favourable positions around the bridges over the Po. When on 8 April, Murat finally launched his first attempt to cross the bridge at Occhiobello, a dogged defensive action by Mohr's outnumbered infantry combined with a devastating artillery barrage, threw the Neapolitan attack back in disarray. After successive charges, including one by an entire dragoon regiment, were repulsed by the Austrians, the Neapolitan morale slowly disintegrated and the assault petered out.

The following day, Murat again attempted to force a crossing but by now Frimont had reinforced Mohr's force to around 10,000 men. On the other hand, the Neapolitan force had dwindled due to large numbers of the less enthusiastic officers and men deserting Murat's cause altogether. By the end of the second day, Murat was compelled to fall back from Occhiobello and establish a new defensive position in preparation of the inevitable Austrian counterattack. To make matters worse, news had reached Italy that the United Kingdom had declared war on Murat and were sending a fleet of gunboats to the Adriatic Sea.

== Aftermath ==
The Neapolitans had sustained over 2,000 casualties during the two days of fighting with thousands more deserting. The Austrians had sustained only 400 casualties and had established a bridgehead around Occhiobello from where they would able to launch attacks against Carpi and Casaglia. With the morale of Neapolitan army broken and the partisans in Lombardy unable to join his cause, Murat would eventually be forced to retire back to his original headquarters in Ancona by late April.

Preceded by Battle of the Panaro	Napoleonic Wars; Battle of Occhiobello	Succeeded by Battle of Carpi (1815)
