= Joachim Murat =

French military officer and statesman (1767–1815)

- Marshal of the Empire; Admiral of France
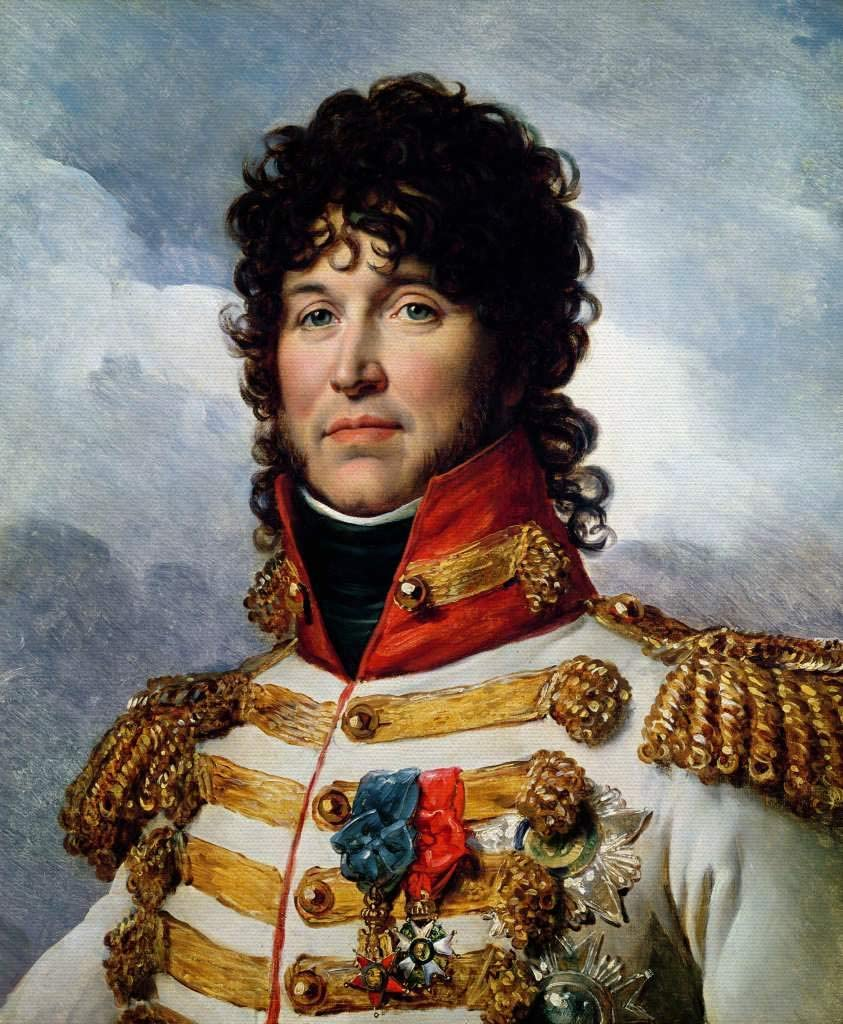
- Portrait c. 1808

King of Naples
- Reign: 1 August 1808 – 20 May 1815
- Predecessor: Joseph I
- Successor: Ferdinand IV

Grand Duke of Berg
- Reign: 15 March 1806 – 1 August 1808
- Successor: Napoléon Louis
- Born: Joachim Murat-Jordy; 25 March 1767; Labastide-Fortunière, Quercy, France
- Died: 13 October 1815 (aged 48); Pizzo Calabro, Calabria, Kingdom of Naples
- Burial: St Giorgio Church, Pizzo, Calabria (cenotaph at Père Lachaise Cemetery, Paris)
- Spouse: Caroline Bonaparte (m. 1800)
- Issue: 4, including Achille and Lucien
- House: Murat
- Father: Pierre Murat-Jordy
- Mother: Jeanne Loubières
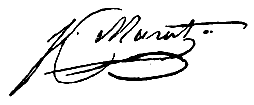
- Signature
- Military career
- Allegiance: Kingdom of France; Kingdom of the French; French First Republic; First French Empire
- Branch: French Army
- Service years: 1787–1813
- Rank: Marshal of the Empire
- Conflicts: See list: French Revolutionary Wars; War of the First Coalition; Campaign in Italy (1796–1797); War of the Second Coalition; French Invasion of Egypt; Battle of Marengo; Napoleonic Wars; War of the Third Coalition; Ulm campaign; Battle of Donauwörth; Battle of Wertingen; Battle of Amstetten; Battle of Austerlitz; War of the Fourth Coalition; Battle of Schleiz; Battle of Jena; Battle of Prenzlau; Battle of Golymin; Battle of Eylau; Battle of Heilsberg; Peninsular War; Second of May Uprising; French Invasion of Russia; Battle of Ostrovno; Battle of Smolensk; Battle of Borodino; French occupation of Moscow; Battle of Tarutino; War of the Sixth Coalition; Battle of Dresden; Battle of Liebertwolkwitz; Battle of Leipzig; Battle of Taro (1814); Battle of San Maurizio; Hundred Days; Neapolitan War; Battle of the Panaro; Battle of Occhiobello; Battle of Casaglia; Battle of Ronco; Battle of Tolentino (executed)

Joachim Murat (English: /mjʊˈrɑː/ myuu-RAH, French: [ʒɔakim myʁa]; 25 March 1767 – 13 October 1815) was a Marshal of the Empire, regarded as the foremost cavalry commander of the Napoleonic Wars, who reigned as King of Naples as Joachim-Napoleon (Italian: Gioacchino Napoleone) from 1808 to 1815. A brother-in-law of Napoleon, he was also Admiral of France, the first Prince Murat, and Grand Duke of Berg from 1806 to 1808. He was known as the Dandy King and First Horseman of Europe.

Born in Labastide-Fortunière in southwestern France, Murat briefly pursued a vocation in the clergy before enlisting in a cavalry regiment upon the outbreak of the French Revolution. Murat distinguished himself under the command of General Napoleon Bonaparte on 13 Vendémiaire (1795), when he seized a group of large cannons and was instrumental in suppressing the royalist insurrection in Paris. He became Napoleon's aide-de-camp and commanded the cavalry during the French campaigns in Italy and Egypt. Murat played a pivotal role in the Coup of 18 Brumaire (1799), which brought Napoleon to political power. In 1800 he married Caroline Bonaparte, thus becoming a brother-in-law to Napoleon.

Murat was named a Marshal of the Empire on the proclamation of the French Empire. He took part in various battles including those of Ulm, Austerlitz, Jena and Eylau, where he led a famous massed cavalry charge against the Russians. In 1806, Murat was appointed Grand Duke of Berg, a title he held until 1808 when he was named King of Naples. He continued to serve Napoleon during his Russian and German campaigns but abandoned the Grande Armée after the Battle of Leipzig to save his throne. In 1815, Murat launched the Neapolitan War against the Austrian Empire but was decisively defeated at Tolentino. He fled to Corsica and then made a last-ditch attempt to recover his throne, but was soon taken prisoner by King Ferdinand IV of Naples. He was tried for treason and sentenced to death by firing squad in Pizzo.

== Early life ==
The youngest of six surviving children, Joachim Murat was born on 25 March 1767 in La Bastide-Fortunière (later renamed Labastide-Murat after him), in Guyenne (the present-day French department of Lot). His father was Pierre Murat-Jordy, an affluent yeoman, innkeeper, postmaster, and churchwarden, who also served as a steward for the aristocratic Talleyrand family, the largest landowners in the region. His mother was Jeanne Loubières, the daughter of Pierre Loubières and his wife Jeanne Viellescazes.

Murat's parents intended that he pursue a vocation in the church, and his father Pierre was able to procure a scholarship for him to pursue an ecclesiastical career. He was taught by the parish priest, after which he won a place at the College of Saint-Michel at Cahors when he was ten years old. He then entered the seminary of the Lazarists at Toulouse. However, in February 1787, Murat abruptly left the seminary. Some speculate that he was expelled for bad behavior, while others claim that he fell in love and ran away with a girl. Whatever the case, Murat soon ran out of money. Unsure of what to do next, he signed on with a cavalry regiment that happened to be passing through the city in 1787 and ran away, enlisting on 23 February 1787 in the Chasseurs des Ardennes, which the following year became known as the Chasseurs de Champagne, or the 12th Chasseurs.

In 1789, an incident we have little to no information about led to his dismissal from the army, despite having attained the rank of sergeant-major. After this debacle he returned to his family, becoming a clerk to a haberdasher at Saint-Céré.

== Military career ==
=== French Revolutionary Wars ===
By 1790, Murat had joined the National Guard. The Canton of Montaucon sent him as its representative to the Fête de la Fédération, the celebration of the first anniversary of Bastille Day (la Fête nationale). He was reinstated in his former regiment. Because part of the 12th Chasseurs had been sent to Montmédy to protect the royal family on its flight to Varennes, the regiment had to defend its honour and loyalty to the Republic. Murat and the regiment's adjutant made a speech to the assembly at Toul to that effect.

In 1792, Murat joined the Constitutional Guard, but left it that same year. His departure was attributed to various causes, including his constant quarreling and dueling, although he claimed he left to avoid punishment for being absent without leave.

An ardent Republican, Murat wrote to his brother in 1791 stating he was preoccupied with revolutionary affairs and would sooner die than cease to be a patriot. Upon his departure from the Constitutional Guard, he reported to the Committee of Surveillance of the Constitutional Assembly that the Guard was guilty of treason and that his lieutenant colonel, a man named Descours, had encouraged him to serve in the émigré army of Louis Joseph, Prince of Condé, then stationed in Koblenz. This garnered for him the support of the Republicans. Murat rejoined his former regiment and was promoted to corporal in April, and in May to sergeant.

By 19 November 1792, Murat was 25 years old and elated at his latest promotion. As a sous-lieutenant, he thought, his family must recognise that he had no great propensity for the priesthood, and he was hoping to prove that he had not been wrong in wishing to be a soldier. Two of the ministers had accused him of being an aristocrat, confusing him with the noble family of Murat d'Auvergne, an accusation that continued to haunt him for the next several years.

==== 13 Vendémiaire ====
In the autumn of 1795, two years after King Louis XVI had been guillotined, royalists and counter-revolutionaries organised an armed uprising. On 3 October, General Napoleon Bonaparte, who was stationed in Paris, was named commander of the French National Convention's defending forces. Bonaparte tasked Murat, who had offered himself voluntarily, with the gathering of artillery from a suburb outside the control of the government's forces.

Murat managed to take the cannons of the Camp des Sablons and transport them to the centre of Paris while avoiding the rioters. The use of these cannons – the famous "whiff of grapeshot" – on 5 October allowed Bonaparte to save the members of the National Convention. Napoleon's later report did not mention Murat, but Napoleon did not forget him, as Murat was made a marshal, the "First Horseman of Europe", Grand Duke of Berg and King of Naples.

==== Italian and Egyptian campaigns ====
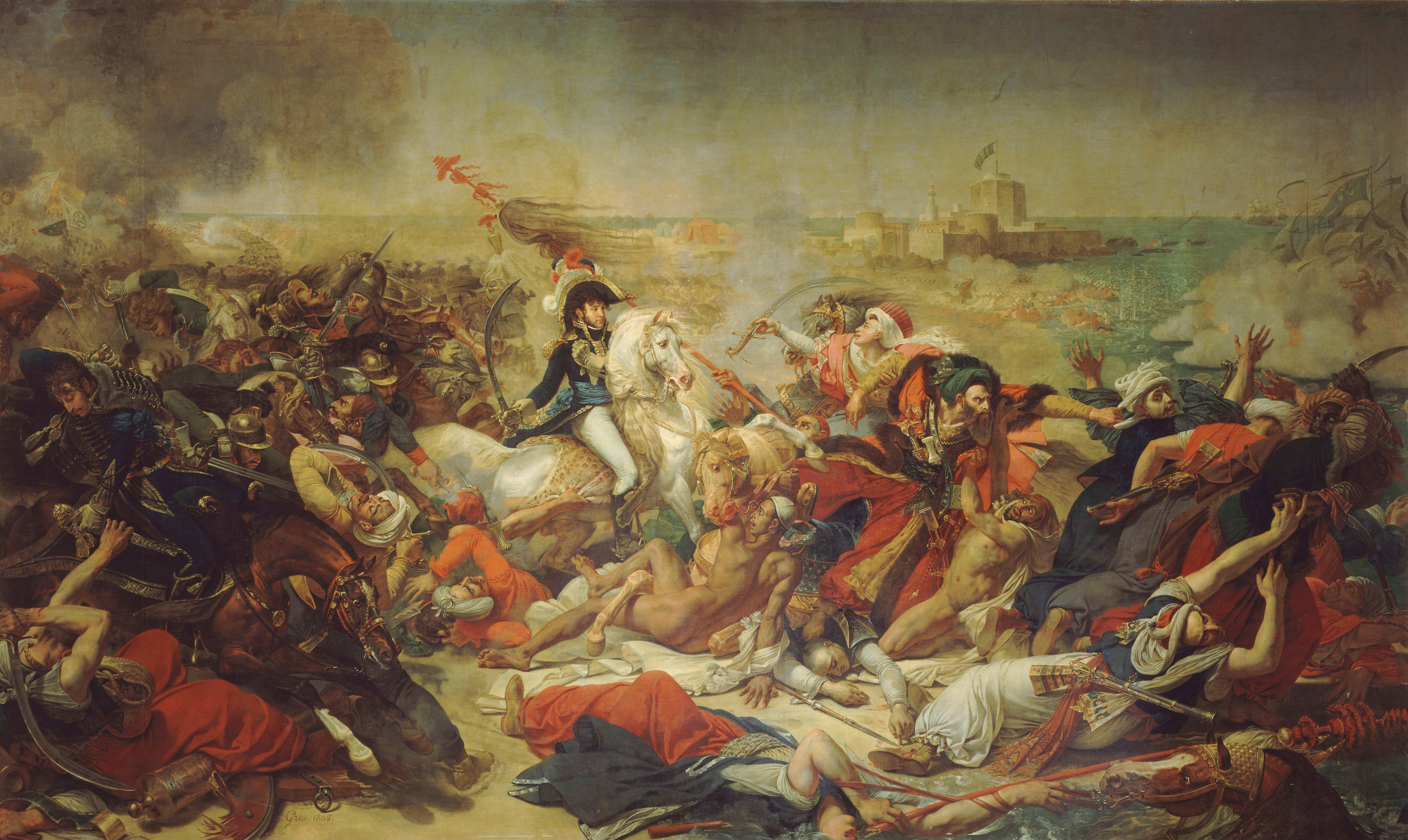
Murat at the Battle of Abukir, painted by Antoine-Jean Gros (1804)

In 1796, Joachim Murat went with Bonaparte to northern Italy, initially as his aide-de-camp, and was later named commander of the cavalry during the many campaigns against the Austrians and their allies.

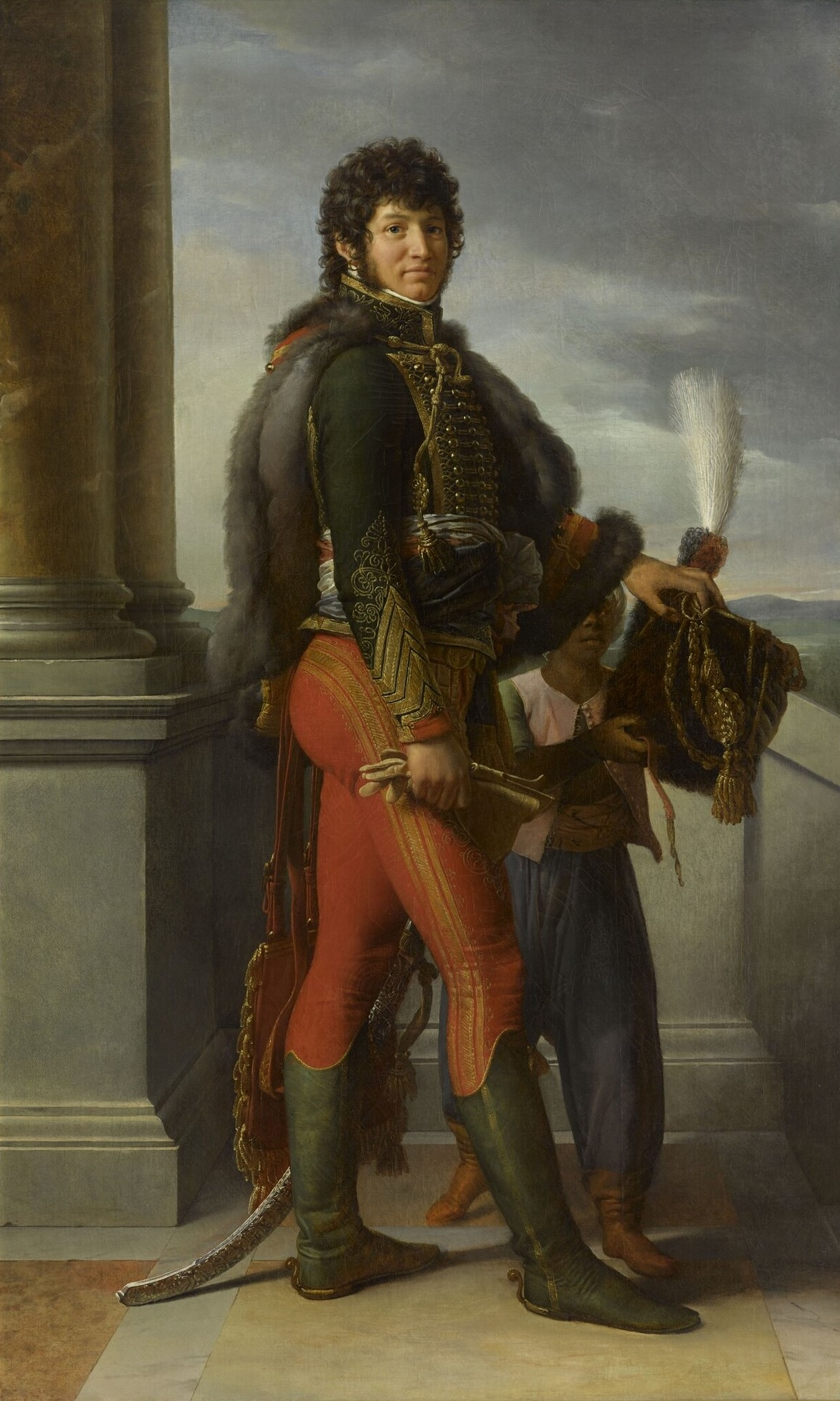
Murat in hussar uniform as commander of the Consular Guard, by François Gérard (1801)

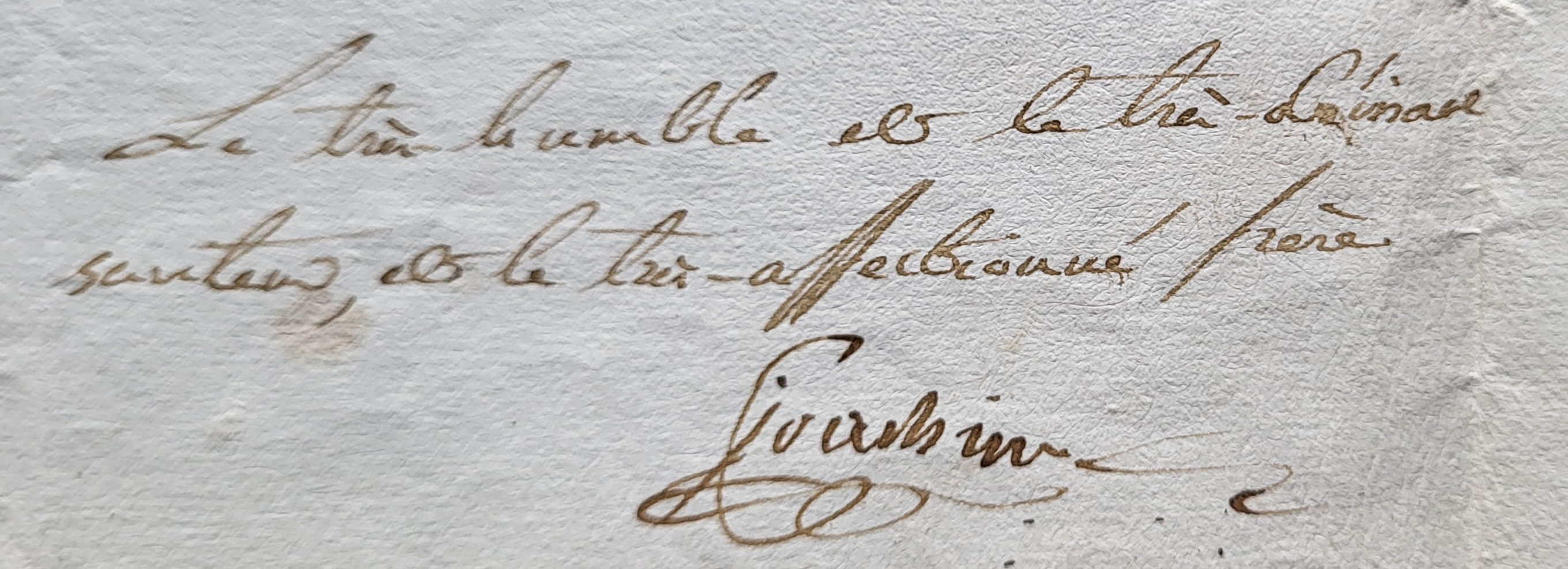
Joachim Murat's signature, brother-in-law of Napoleon Bonaparte, at the bottom of a letter of complaint in 1807.

Murat commanded the cavalry of the French Egyptian expedition of 1798, again under Bonaparte. On 25 July 1799 at the Battle of Abukir, he successfully led the cavalry charge that broke the Ottoman line.

In 1799, some remaining staff officers, including Murat, and Bonaparte returned to France, eluding various British fleets in five frigates. A short while later, Murat played an important, even pivotal, role in Bonaparte's "coup within a coup" of 18 Brumaire (9 November 1799), when he first assumed political power.

Murat married Caroline Bonaparte, with whom he shared the same birthday, in a civil ceremony on 20 January 1800 at Mortefontaine and in a religious ceremony on 4 January 1802 in Paris, thus becoming a son-in-law of Letizia Ramolino as well as brother-in-law to Napoleon Bonaparte, Joseph Bonaparte, Lucien Bonaparte, Elisa Bonaparte, Louis Bonaparte, Pauline Bonaparte and Jérôme Bonaparte. Caroline had an affair with Murat's rival and at the time the Governor of Paris, Jean-Andoche Junot, until it was broken off by Junot.

Prior to his marriage, Murat has engaged in a relationship with Francesca Lechi (1773–1806), whom he met at a ball in Milan.

=== Napoleonic Wars ===
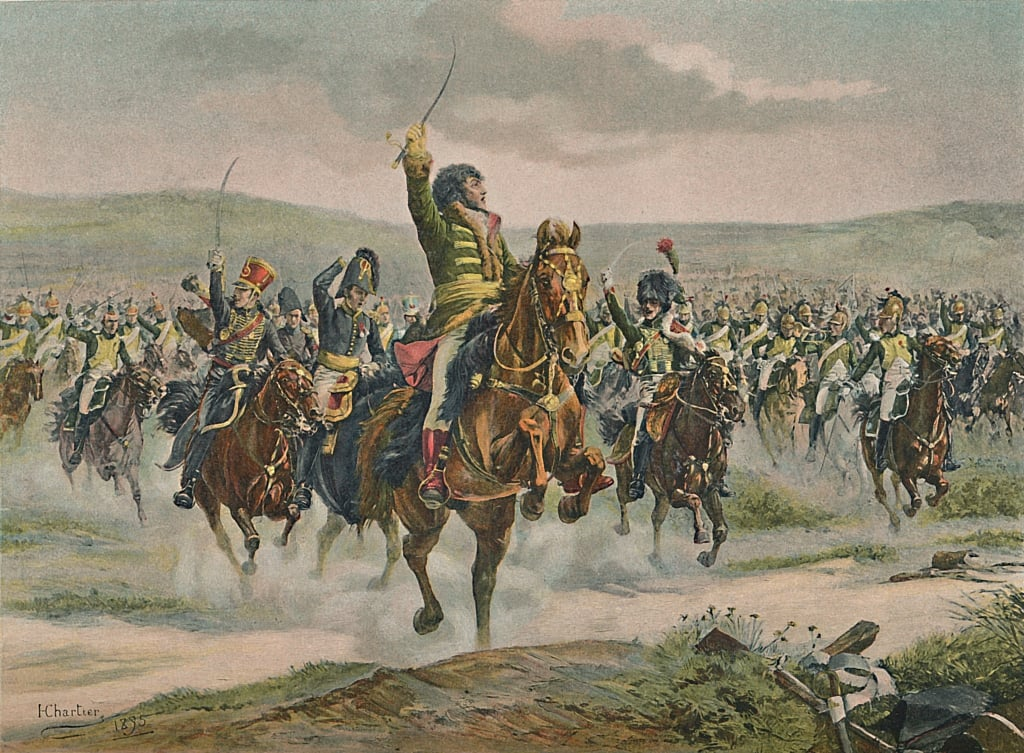
Murat leading a cavalry charge at the Battle of Jena, 14 October 1806

Napoleon made Murat a Marshal of the Empire on 18 May 1804, and granted him the title of "First Horseman of Europe". He was made Prince of the Empire and Admiral of the Empire in 1805, despite having very little knowledge about naval warfare. He fought in various battles, during 1805–1807, including those of Ulm, Austerlitz, Jena and Eylau, where he led a famous cavalry charge against the Russians.

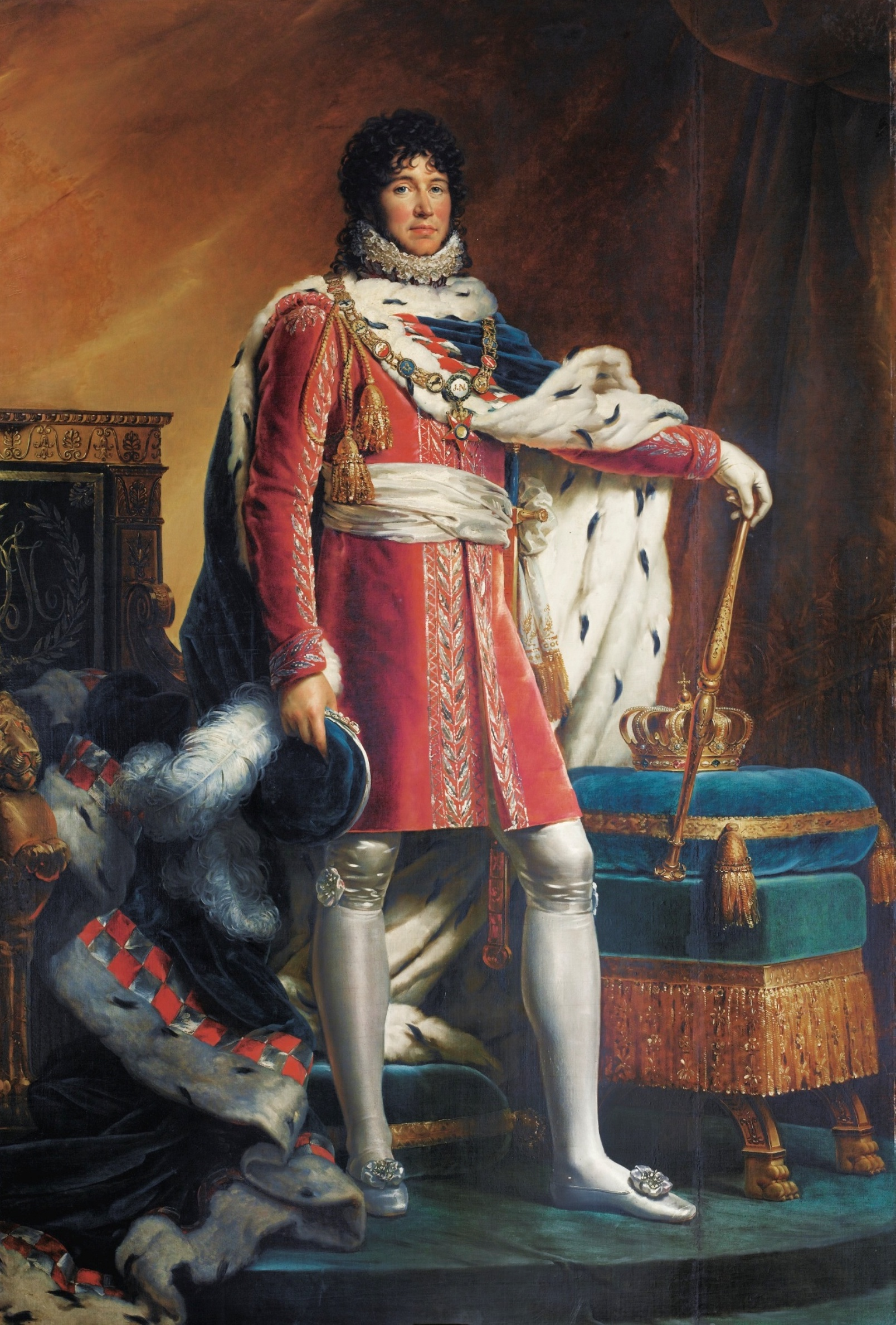
Murat as King of Naples, c. 1812

After several territorial concessions made by Prussia, the Grand Duchy of Berg was set up, he was appointed Grand Duke of Berg and Duke of Cleves on 15 March 1806, and held this title until 1 August 1808, when he was named King of Naples. Murat was in charge of the French Army in Madrid when the popular Dos de Mayo Uprising, which started the Peninsular War, broke out.

Murat proved to be equally useful in the Russian campaign of 1812, where he distinguished himself as the best cavalry commander of the Grande Armée at battles such as Smolensk and Borodino.

Although he was a great horseman, Murat showed a total lack of concern for the well-being of the horses. Napoleon had created the greatest forage problem known in military history by putting together a cavalry of 40,000 men and horses. The long marches and the lack of rest meant that the horses suffered from hunger, bad fodder, saddle sores and exhaustion, but these factors were aggravated by Murat himself. He also failed to forge caulkin shoes for the horses to enable them in the retreat to traverse roads that had become iced over. The Polish cavalry and Caulaincourt knew this and acted accordingly.

He continued to serve Napoleon during the German Campaign of 1813. Following Napoleon's defeat at the Battle of Leipzig, Murat reached a secret agreement with the Allies in order to save his own throne and switched sides to the Coalition.

=== Neapolitan War ===
Following further military defeats, Napoleon abdicated on 6 April 1814. At the Congress of Vienna, Klemens von Metternich, Austria's Foreign Minister, was bound by other coalition allies that wanted to restore Ferdinand IV of the House of Bourbon to the Neapolitan throne, particularly Britain.

With his throne no longer secure, following Napoleon's return from exile, Murat switched sides in an unsuccessful attempt to return to Napoleon's favour. On 15 March 1815, the Kingdom of Naples declared war on the Austrian Empire, starting the Neapolitan War. With an estimated 45,000 troops, the Neapolitan army invaded the Papal States and Tuscany. Though the Austrian army in northern Italy numbered 94,000 troops, it was widely distributed. On 30 March 1815, Murat's troops arrived in Rimini, where they were hosted by the Battaglini counts. In a final attempt to gain allies, Murat published the Rimini Proclamation, though it may have been backdated after his military defeats.

Murat's eastern column advanced northwards from Rimini towards the River Po, entering Bologna on 2 April, while the western column reached Florence on 8 April. On the same day, the eastern column engaged 3,000 Austrian soldiers at the Battle of Occhiobello. Following its defeat at Occhiobello, it was pushed southwards, leading to Murat's decisive defeat at the Battle of Tolentino on 2–3 May. Murat returned to Naples on 18 May, where Caroline had already surrendered to the British, and fled immediately to southern France.

== Death ==
Hearing of Napoleon's defeat at the Battle of Waterloo on 18 June 1815, Murat fled to Corsica, from which he attempted an impossible invasion of Calabria. Napoleon remarked: "Murat attempted to reconquer with 200 men that territory which he failed to hold when he had 80,000 at his disposal." Murat was captured, sentenced to death, and shot by firing squad in Pizzo Calabro on 13 October 1815.

According to the memoirs of Murat's granddaughter:

On being asked if he had any request to make, he said he wished to have a bath prepared for him and perfumed with a bottle of eau-de-Cologne, and, as a last request, that his eyes should not be bandaged. Both wishes were granted, and, by order sent by King Ferdinand, twelve of his own soldiers were selected to shoot him. When the fatal hour came, seeing the emotion of his men, Murat said, "My friends, if you wish to spare me, aim at my heart."

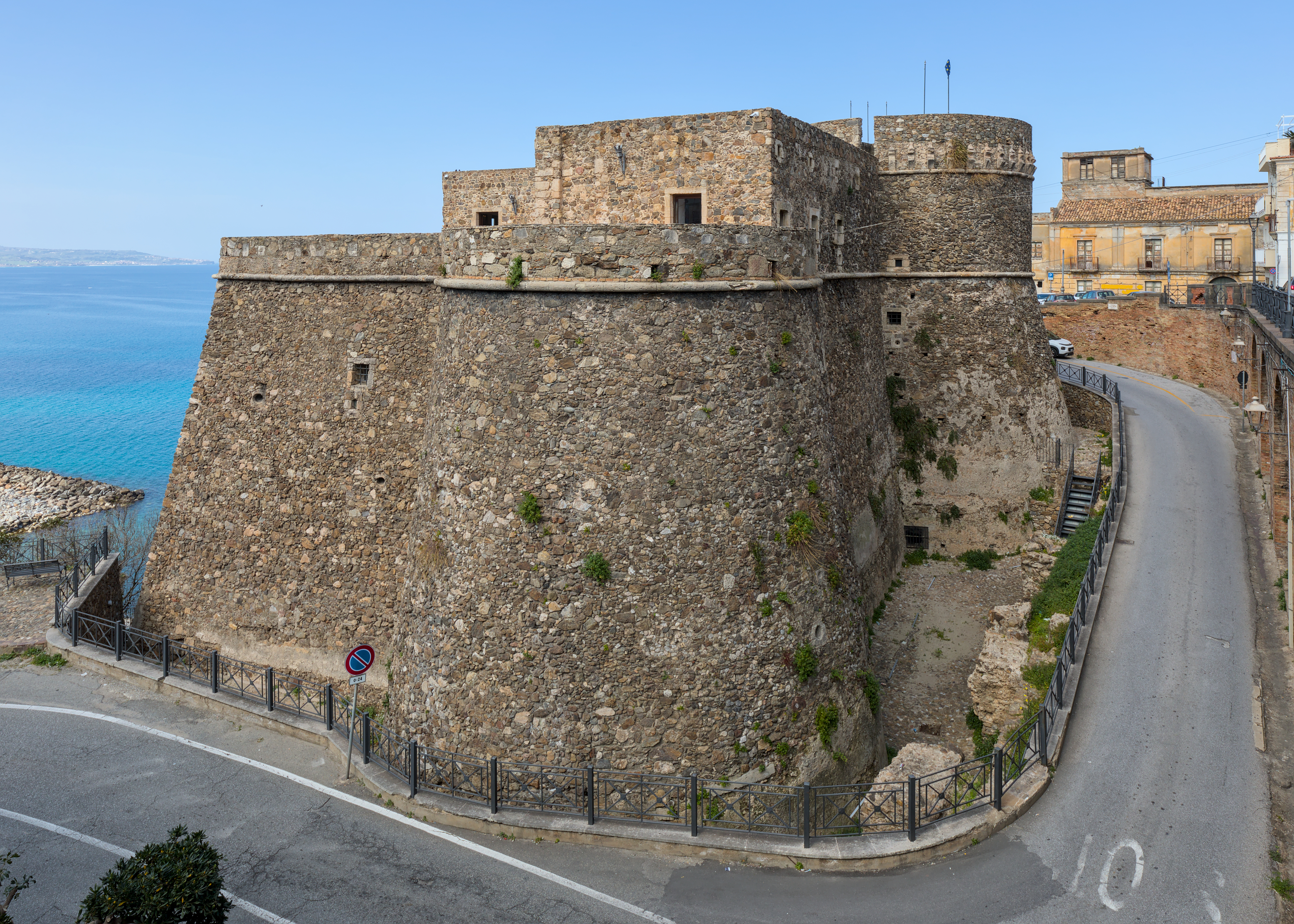
Castello di Pizzo, Murat's place of imprisonment and execution

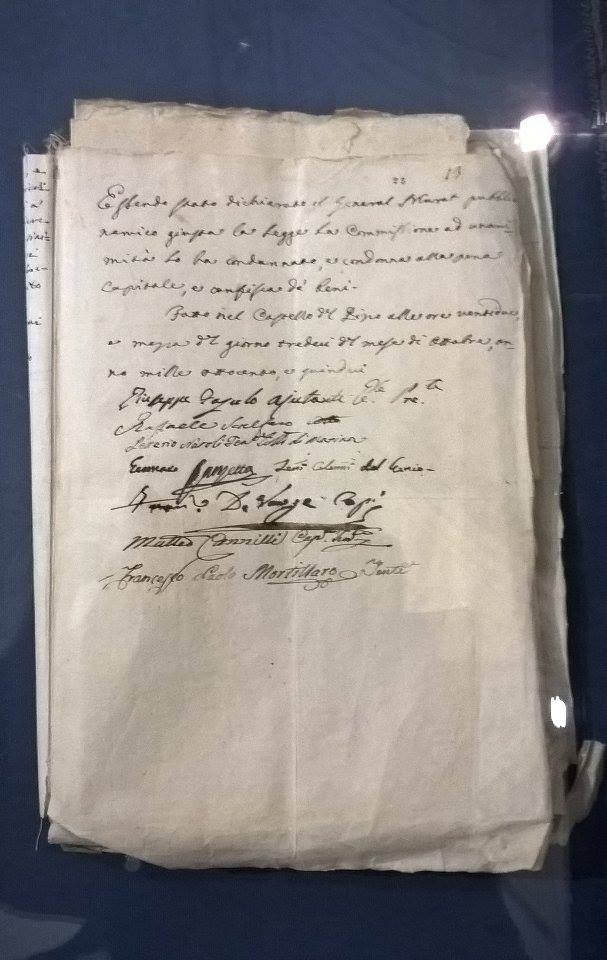
Murat's death sentence, as shown in the Naples State Archive

Murat showed courage at his execution, facing the firing squad standing and without a blindfold.

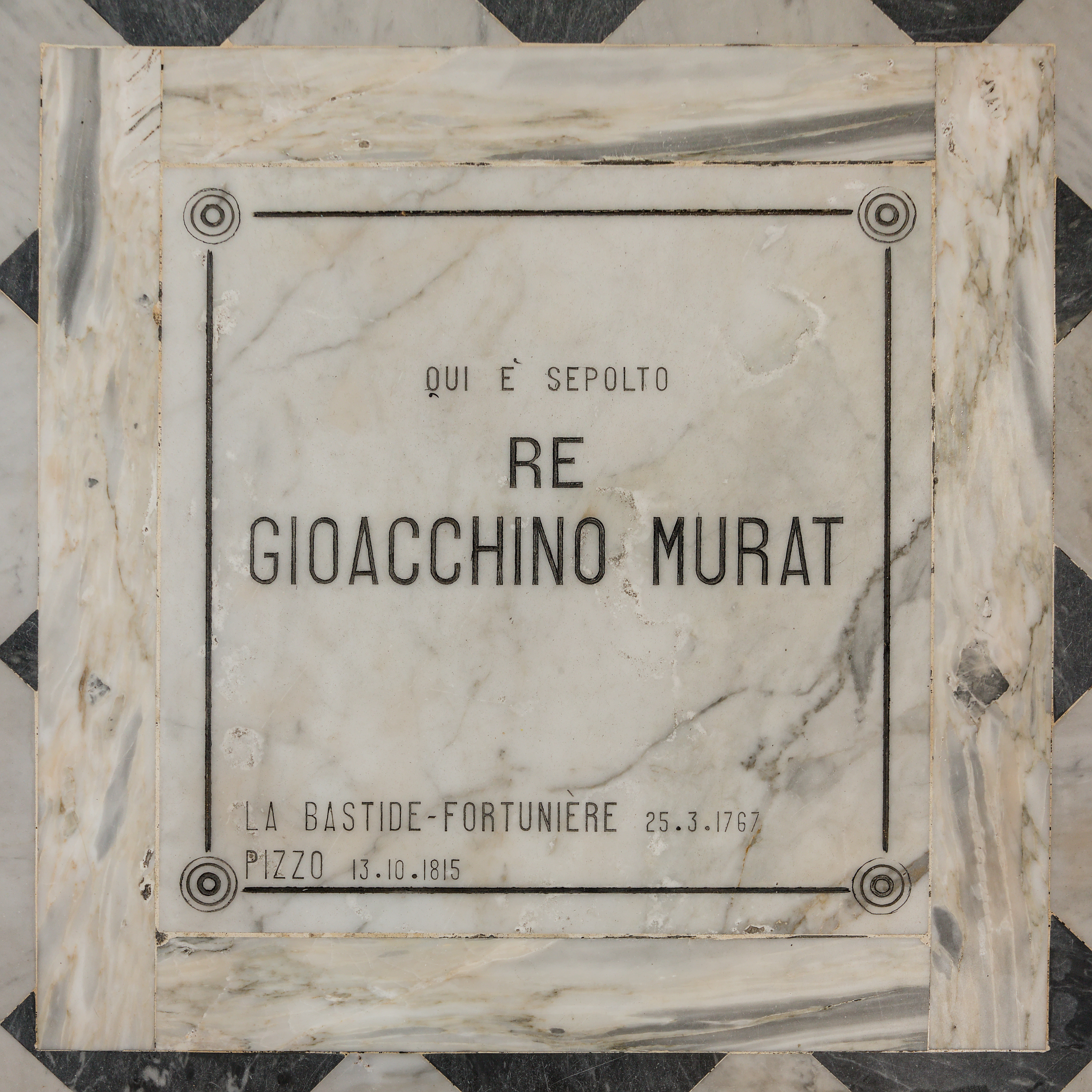
Murat's gravestone, in the church of St. George, Pizzo, Calabria.

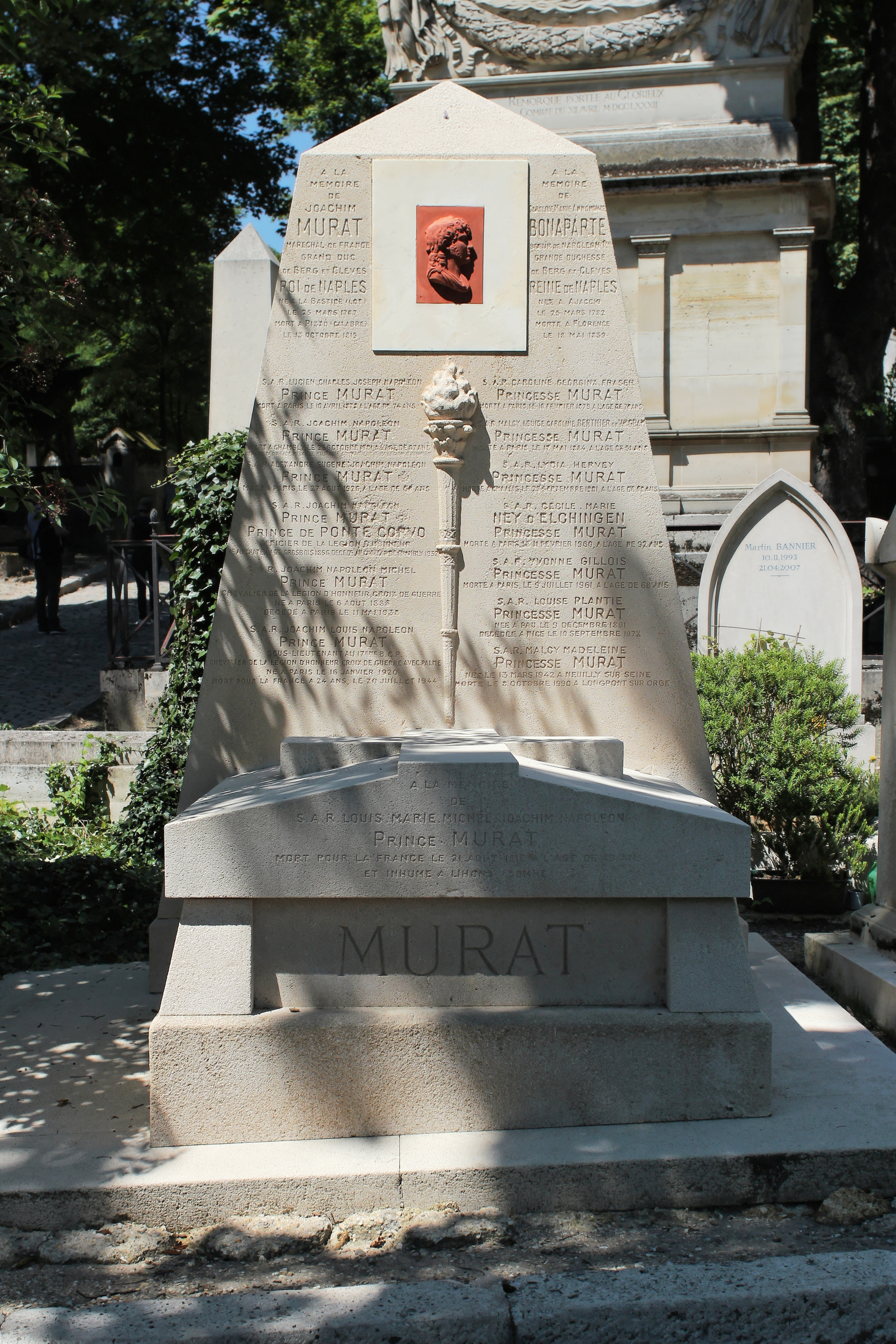
Murat's Cenotaph in Père Lachaise Cemetery, Paris

== Coats of arms ==
Coat of arms as Grand Duke of Berg

Coat of arms as King of Naples

== Children ==
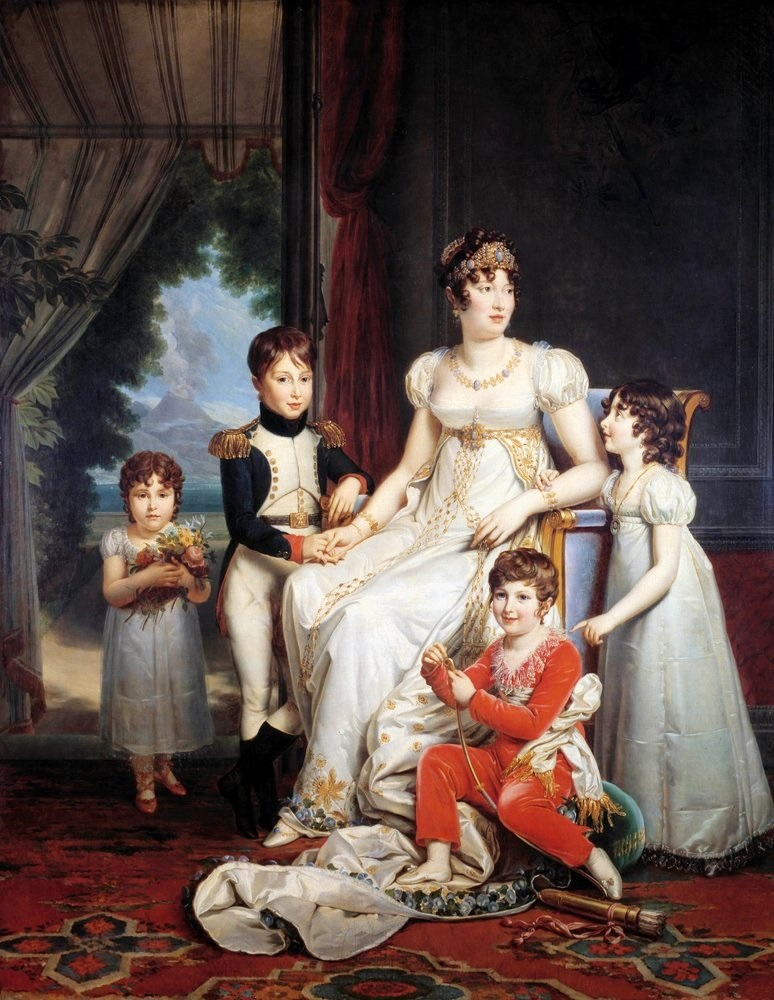
Caroline Bonaparte and her children

Murat and Caroline had four children:

- Achille Charles Louis Napoléon Murat, Hereditary Prince of Berg, Prince of Naples, 2nd Prince Murat (Paris, 21 January 1801 – Jefferson County, Florida, 15 April 1847), m. Tallahassee, Florida, 12 July 1826 Catherine Daingerfield Willis (near Fredericksburg, Virginia, 17 August 1803 – Tallahassee, Florida, 7 August 1867), daughter of Colonel Byrd C. Willis (29 August 1781 – 1846) and wife Mary Lewis, and great-grandniece of George Washington, without issue
- Princess Marie Letizia Josephine Annonciade Murat (Paris, 26 April 1802 – Bologna, 12 March 1859), m. Venice, 27 October 1823 Guido Taddeo Pepoli, Marchese Pepoli, Conte di Castiglione (Bologna, 7 September 1789 – Bologna, 2 March 1852), and had issue
- Lucien Charles Joseph Napoléon Murat, 2nd Sovereign Prince of Pontecorvo, 3rd Prince Murat (Milan, 16 May 1803 – Paris, 10 April 1878), m. Bordentown, New Jersey, 18 August 1831 Caroline Georgina Fraser (Charleston, South Carolina, 13 April 1810 – Paris, 10 February 1879), daughter of Thomas Fraser and wife Anne Lauton, and had issue; he was an associate of his first cousin Napoleon III of France. Ancestor of René Auberjonois
- Princess Louise Julie Caroline Murat (Paris, 21 March 1805 – Ravenna, 1 December 1889), m. Trieste, 25 October 1825 Giulio Conte Rasponi (Ravenna, 19 February 1787 – Florence, 19 July 1876) and had issue.

== See also ==
- Monumento a los Caídos por España (Madrid)
- Nunzio Otello Francesco Gioacchino (Servant)

== Notes ==
Joachim Murat House of Murat Born: 25 March 1767 Died: 13 October 1815
Regnal titles
New title	Grand Duke of Berg; 15 Mar 1806 – 1 Aug 1808	Succeeded by Louis II
Preceded by Joseph I	King of Naples; 1 Aug 1808 – 19 May 1815	Succeeded by Ferdinand IV
French nobility of the First French Empire
New title	Prince Murat	Succeeded by Achille Murat
