= Giovanni Riso, Baron of Colòbria =

Italian politician (1836–1901)

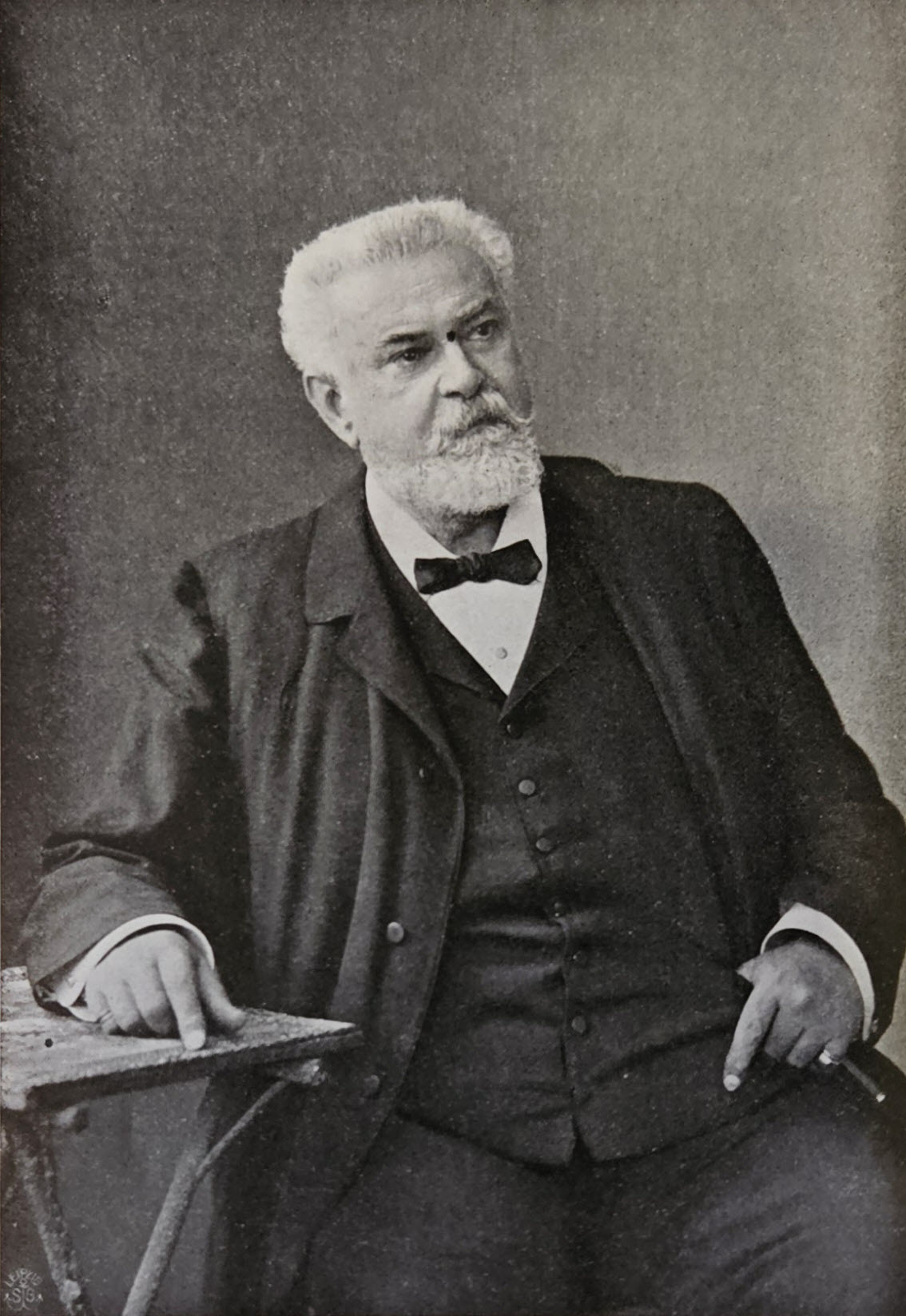
- Riso, circa 1890
- Born: 13 February 1836; Palermo, Kingdom of the Two Sicilies
- Died: 7 November 1901 (aged 65); Palermo, Kingdom of Italy
- Burial place: Riso family tomb, Cemetery of Santa Maria di Gesù, Palermo
- Title: Deputy, 4th District of Palermo, XI Legislature, Kingdom of Italy
- Term: 1870–71 (Florence); 1871–72 (Rome)
- Spouse: Emilie Thérèsia Joséphine Emmanuel du Hallay-Coëtquen (m. 1856)
- Children: Maria Louisa (1859–1922); Domenico

Giovanni Antonio Riso (Notarbartolo), (Note: He is sometimes referred to as Giovanni Riso Notarbartolo using the Spanish naming system: father’s last name followed by mother’s maiden name, to avoid confusion with his grandfather also named Giovanni Riso.) Baron of Colòbria (13 February 1836 – 7 November 1901), was a Sicilian patriot active in the Unification of Italy and scion of one of the wealthiest families in 19th-century Palermo.

Born in Palermo, Riso studied in Paris as a young man, where in 1856 he married the beautiful daughter of French aristocrats. Inspired by European liberal principles in Paris, Riso conspired in the planning and financing of the Gancia Revolt in April 1860 in Palermo against the oppressive Spanish Bourbon monarchy of the Kingdom of the Two Sicilies. The revolt failed and led to the summary execution of thirteen revolutionaries by the Bourbons. Riso and co-conspirators were imprisoned and nearly executed for their subversive activities. These events directly precipitated the arrival one month later of Giuseppe Garibaldi and his Expedition of the Thousand in Sicily in May 1860. As part of his Siege of Palermo in May 1860, Garibaldi negotiated the release of Riso and co-conspirators. They rode in triumphant procession from the prison to meet Garibaldi, and he tearfully thanked them for their service. Garibaldi proceeded onward toward Naples where he defeated the Bourbons, and then in March 1861 handed-over control to Vittorio Emanuele II to form the new Kingdom of Italy.

Riso served as an aide-de-camp and Officer of the Guides in the government of the new kingdom. He was appointed a Gentleman of the Court in 1869, and in 1870 was elected to the Chamber of Deputies where he served for two years representing Palermo.

In 1875 Riso retired to his vast estate adjacent to the town of Carlentini, Sicily, where he built a palace, managed his business and agricultural interests, and lived according to his ideals as an enlightened landowner and Carlentini's most prominent citizen and benefactor.

== Ancestry ==
=== Grandparents ===
Riso's grandfather was also named Giovanni Riso (born 1776 in Palermo, died 1841 in Palermo, age 65). He was a self-made entrepreneur and the founder of the Riso family wealth. He was among a small group of modern business operators in Palermo whose wealth was based on trade and finance rather than land ownership. Others included Vincenzo Florio Sr. (shipping, Marsala wine), Gabriele Chiaramonte Bordonaro (finance and banking), and the British Ingham-Whitaker family (Marsala wine).

As a boy, Giovanni Riso (the grandfather) was one of the first twelve students in the “Real Istituto Nautico di Palermo” (“Royal Nautical Institute”) founded in 1789 by the famous Don Giovanni Fileti, royal navy commander, to train sailors for the Sicilian merchant navy. Riso was described as “needy” and was granted a scholarship, but “was able to acquire a respected name in commerce with his ingenuity, energy and skillful dealings, and become that Baron Giovanni Riso, diligent founder of one of the richest families of the Sicilian nobility.” Shortly after graduation he became captain of the ship “Seminario Nautico”, an armed xebec with twelve cannons (a two masted Mediterranean cargo ship, armed to protect against Barbary pirates). He became a teacher and later director of the school. In 1799 as a result of his extraordinary sailing skills, the king granted him a commission with the rank of “Captain” in the Royal Marines.

He owned cargo ships that sailed routes from North America to the Dardanelles. In 1818 his brigantine “Oreto” arrived in Boston harbor with a cargo of citrus, sulfur, and manna [a type of sweetener], and was the first cargo ship to arrive in North America from the Kingdom of the Two Sicilies. Among his many business interests, he invested in shipping partnerships with Florio and others, owned sulfur mines in central Sicily (sulfur was exported primarily to Britain to make gunpowder).

Feudo di Colòbria. In 1814 he bought the Feudo di Colòbria in central Sicily, an estate that brought with it the right to the noble title of “Baron of Colòbria”.

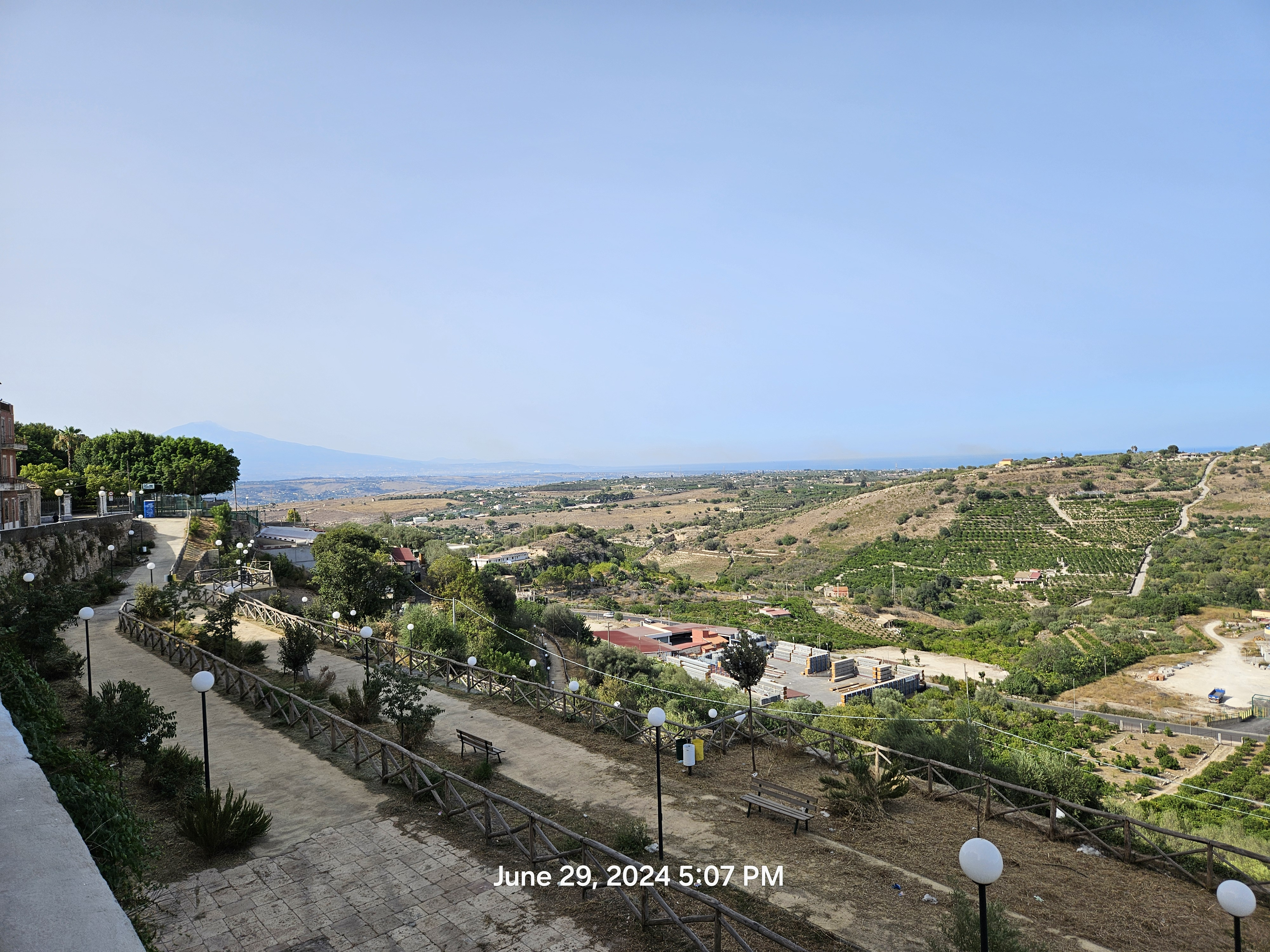
Feudo Murgo, Carlentini, Sicily. Looking northeast from the site of the former Palazzo Riso.

Feudo Murgo. In 1836 he bought the immense Feudo Murgo with a land area of 2,350 hectares (approximately 9 square miles) on the southern edge of the fertile Piana di Catania on the east coast of Sicily. The feudo (estate) was described as running from the gates of Carlentini to the sea at the small harbor of Agnone Bagni. The feudo included the ruins of the unfinished Basilica del Murgo founded in 1220 by Sicilian King Federico II (1194–1250), who hunted on the land.

Giovanni Riso and his wife Anna Villa had three children: Pietro (father of the subject of this article), Carolina, and Marianna.

=== Parents ===
Riso's father was Pietro Riso (born 1810 in Palermo, died 1854 in Palermo, age 44). In 1841, on his father's death, Pietro inherited the title of “Baron of Colòbria” along with the bulk of his father's estate and became one of the wealthiest men in Palermo. He continued his father's various partnerships and business interests. In 1841 he invested with Florio and others in a new company to own and operate steam-powered cargo and passenger ships which were gradually replacing sailing ships.

In 1834 Pietro married Maria Antonia Notarbartolo (1818–1897), daughter of the Duke of Villarosa and member of one of the oldest noble families in Sicily. They had three children, Giovanni (the subject of this article), Marianna, and Rosalie. Pietro and Maria Antonia separated in 1842, and their children stayed with their father, although Riso remained on good terms with his mother who corresponded regularly.

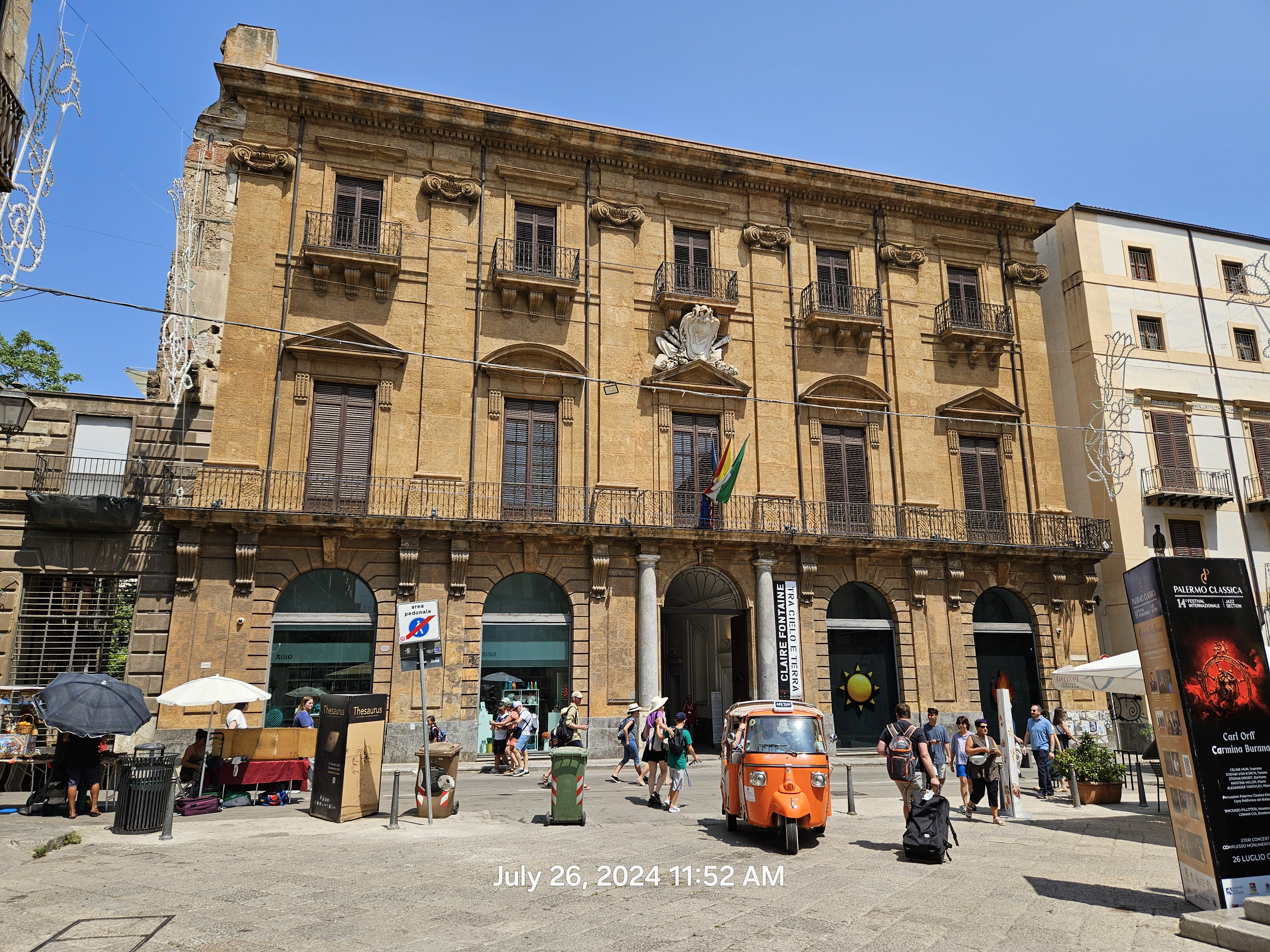
Palazzo Belmonte-Riso, Palermo

Palazzo Belmonte-Riso: In 1841 Pietro bought the Palazzo Belmonte, among the largest private palaces in Palermo, facing the Piazza Bologni on the Via Toledo [today Via Vittorio Emanuele], the principal street in Palermo running from the Palazzo dei Normanni to the port. The palace was commissioned in 1784 by the Prince of Belmonte and had a huge ballroom with a fresco “La Fama” (now lost) by Antonio Manno (1739–1810) that covered the entire length of the ballroom ceiling. The ballroom was to play a role in the revolutionary events of 1859–1860.

Pietro participated in the 1848 revolution and served as the head of national guard during the brief 18-month existence of the revolutionary government. After the revolutionary government collapsed, he negotiated a general amnesty with the Bourbon government for all participants except for 43 intellectuals and politicians who were exiled. Pietro along with Florio and Bordonaro were moderate liberals but also practical men of affairs with business interests to protect.

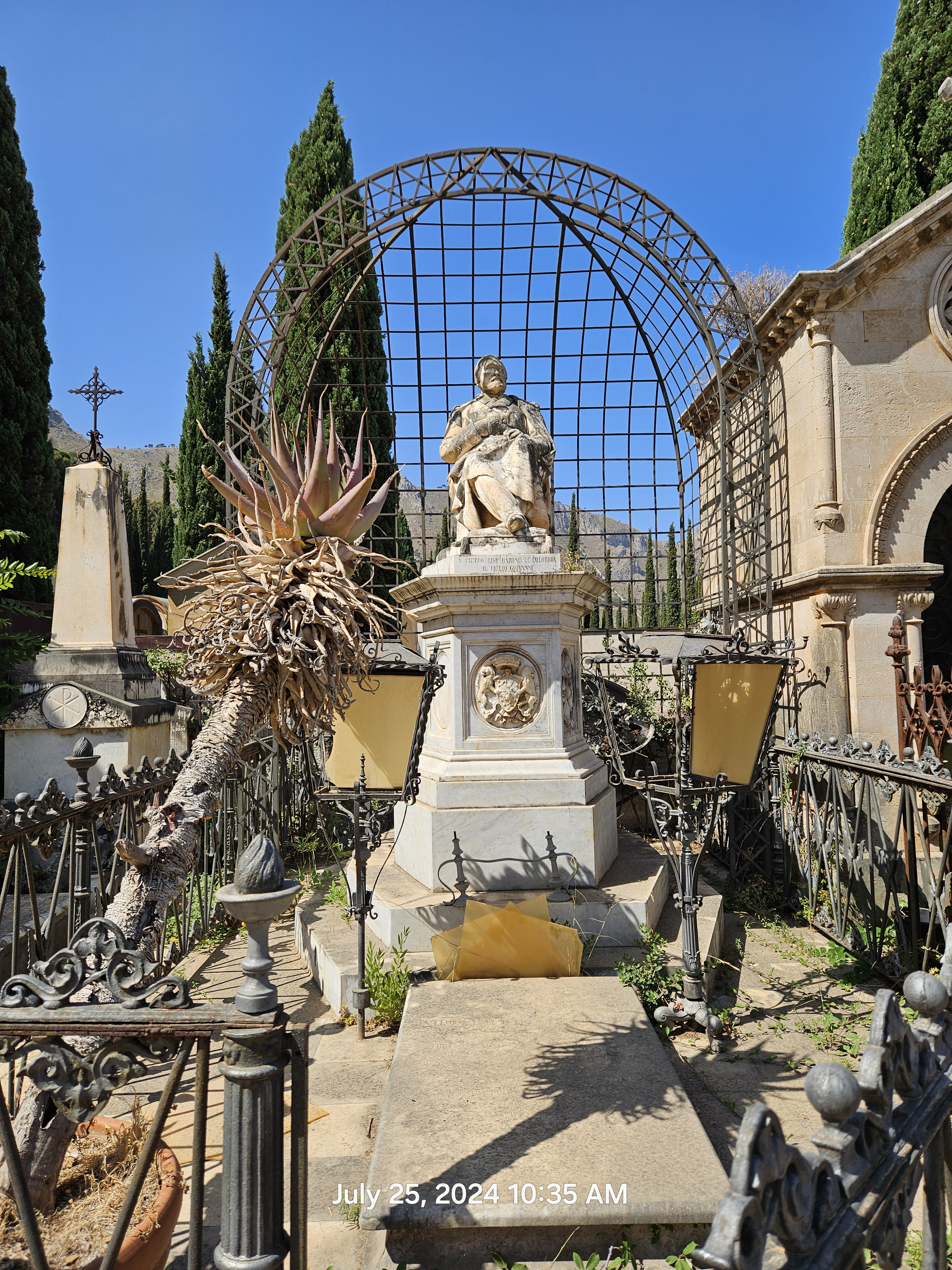
Grave and Monument of Pietro Riso (and also grave of his son Giovanni Riso, subject of this article), Cemetery Santa Maria di Gesù, Palermo

Pietro died at age 44 during the cholera epidemic of 1854 in Sicily. Riso (the subject of this article), commissioned a tomb for his father in the Cemetery of Santa Maria di Gesù in Palermo, with an inscription in his honor: “In perpetual memory Pietro Riso, Barone di Colòbria, who with civic virtue during the Insurrection of 1848 defended the rights of his country as Minister of War, Praetor of Palermo, and Commander of the National Guard. Bitterly mourned, ceased to live on August 17, 1854, stricken by cholera. His affectionate son erected this monument.”

== Biography ==
=== Paris (1850s) ===
In 1854, on his father's death, Riso (then age 18) inherited the title of “Baron of Colòbria” along with the bulk of the Riso family fortune. As a young man Riso studied in Paris, where in 1856 he married Emilie Thérèsia Joséphine Emmanuel du Hallay-Coëtquen (born 1837 in Paris, died 1915 in Nice). She was a daughter of the Marquis du Hallay-Coëtquen (1799–1867) from an ancient noble family of Brittany. Her father was a military man, a member of the elite Kings Guards in France. Hallay was a famous duelist reported to have killed twelve men in sword duels. Her grandfather is entombed in the Père Lachaise cemetery in Paris.

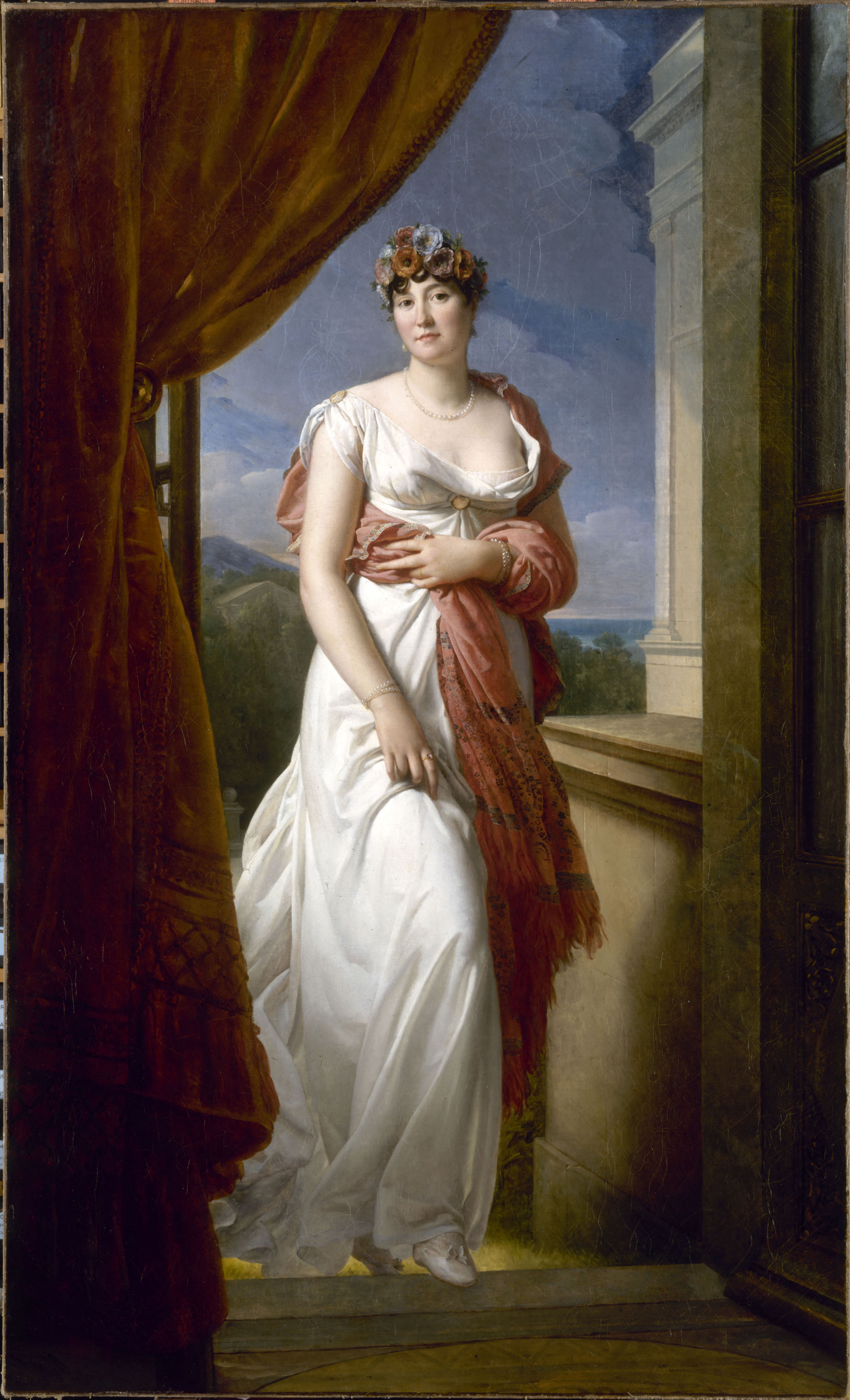
Madame Tallien, grandmother of Giovanni Riso's wife, Thérèsia. Portrait by Gerard painted in 1804, now in the Musée Carnavalet, Paris

On her mother's side, Emilie was the granddaughter of Thérèsia Cabarrus (1773–1835), Princesse de Chimay, known as Madame Tallien. She was a famous French beauty, trend-setter and socialite married three times to some of wealthiest and most powerful men in France. Once she appeared at the Paris Opera wearing a white silk dress with obviously nothing underneath. Talleyrand (1754–1838) commented: "Il n'est pas possible de s'exposer plus somptueusement!" ("One could not be more sumptuously undressed!"). Tallien lived through the Reign of Terror and used her influence to save many from the guillotine. She became friends with Joséphine de Beauharnais (1763–1814), future wife of Napoleon I (1769–1821), when they were both imprisoned during the Reign of Terror. She introduced Joséphine to the young General Napoleon Bonaparte and served as a witness at their wedding in 1796. Although Napoleon is said to have reprimanded Tallien for her uninhibited lifestyle.

Paris had a large colony of exiled nobles from Palermo, and was a favorite destination for young aristocrats, especially after regular steamship service from Palermo to Marseille was established (by a Florio company in which Pietro Riso was an original investor). Travel abroad made the Palermo nobility more open to demands for freedom and progress that were circulating in Europe. Riso's good friend Francesco Brancaccio (1834–1908) described a lively social scene in 1850s Paris filled with Italian exiles forced to leave Italy after the failed Revolution of 1848. The exiles ranged from young firebrands to aging aristocrats whose fortunes had been confiscated in Italy.

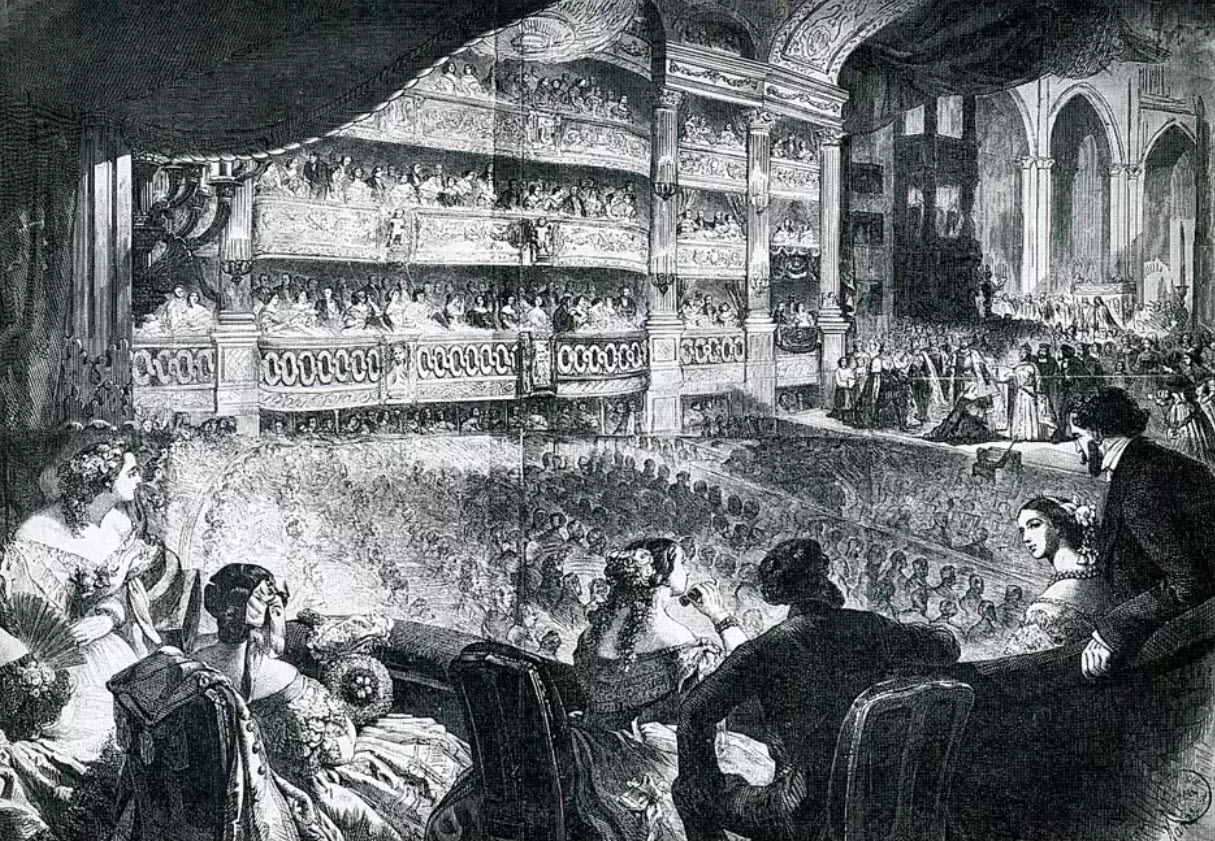
Opera Le Peletier, Paris, interior 1858

In 1857 in Paris, Brancaccio challenged a man to a duel after being insulted during a performance at the Opera Le Peletier, then the principal opera house in Paris before the Opera Garnier was built in 1875. Brancaccio borrowed a sword from his friend Riso for the duel the next day. Although Brancaccio's opponent was a famous swordsman, “fortune smiled on me and the poor devil received a sword blow that knocked him out of combat. This proves how much the appreciation of hotshot swordsmen is often erroneous.” A few months later, in January 1858, French Emperor Napoleon III (1808–1873) survived unharmed an assassination attempt when bombs exploded under his carriage on the way to the same Opera Le Peletier. The attempted assassins were Felice Orsini (1819–1858) and other Italian nationalists aided by British radicals. The bombs, a type of grenade, had been made in London on a design by Orsini and became known as “Orsini bombs”. Although Napoleon III had Orsini executed, the “Orsini affair” is credited with winning the support of Napoleon III for the unification of Italy. In 1859 Riso and his wife Emilie were back in Palermo after their daughter was born in Paris in April 1859. The Palazzo Riso was a center of social life, and Emilie was described as among the most beautiful women in Palermo high society. Among the other activities of a rich young aristocrat, Riso raced trotting horses.

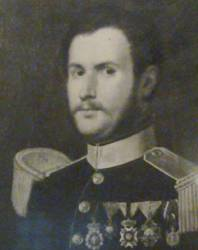
Salvatore Maniscalco (1813–1864), Chief of Police for Sicily under the Bourbon Monarchy

However “In Palermo...the members of the patriotic families who were too young to bear arms in the revolution of 1848, were working secretly and steadily against the cruel repression of all liberty of political thought or action carried out by King Ferdinand II and his representatives [including Chief of Police Salvatore Maniscalco]. Ferdinand's rule was not one of conciliation, with the result that conspiracy followed conspiracy, and many were the martyrs to the cause of freedom, the leaders of the different risings being shot in the public squares as a warning and example.” Palermo in 1859 became a hotbed of conspiracy. People of the highest rank were hiding patriots in their palaces, and plots were being prepared in almost every class. Baron Riso was one of the Liberals who was of great service to his party.

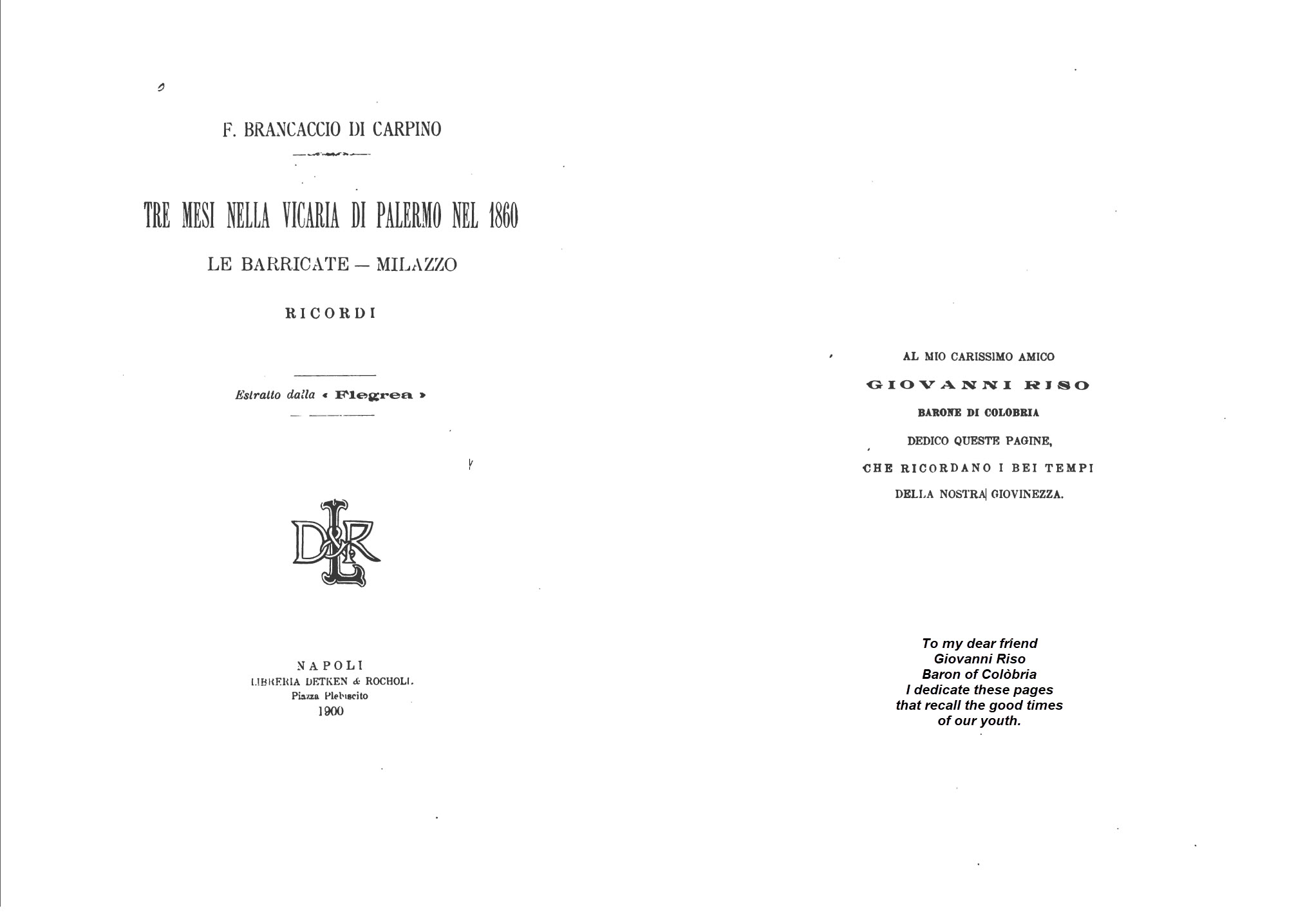
Dedication to Baron Riso. F. Brancaccio, Three Months in the Vicaria Prison of Palermo in 1860

In the fall of 1859, a secret revolutionary committee formed in Palermo composed primarily of middle-class professionals, lawyers, doctors and artisans. Riso's friend Francesco Brancaccio was part of the committee. In his memoire, which Brancaccio dedicated to his friend Riso, Brancaccio related an exchange with Riso in the fall of 1859. Riso indignantly challenged Brancaccio as follows: “I have a hunch that you are part of the conspiracy, but you hide the secret from me, and doing so is not a sign of trust or of friendship. When one faces danger, two friends must face the danger together. You have excluded me, and for this I feel my friendship betrayed.” Brancaccio explained that he was motivated by strong friendship to exclude Riso from the conspiracy. Considering Riso's important position, his wealth, and the comforts he enjoyed, Brancaccio did not want to draw Riso into a situation where prison and the gallows awaited. Riso responded resolutely “I am ready to face either one...and from now on count me in.” Thus the opulent Baron Riso entered the conspiracy.

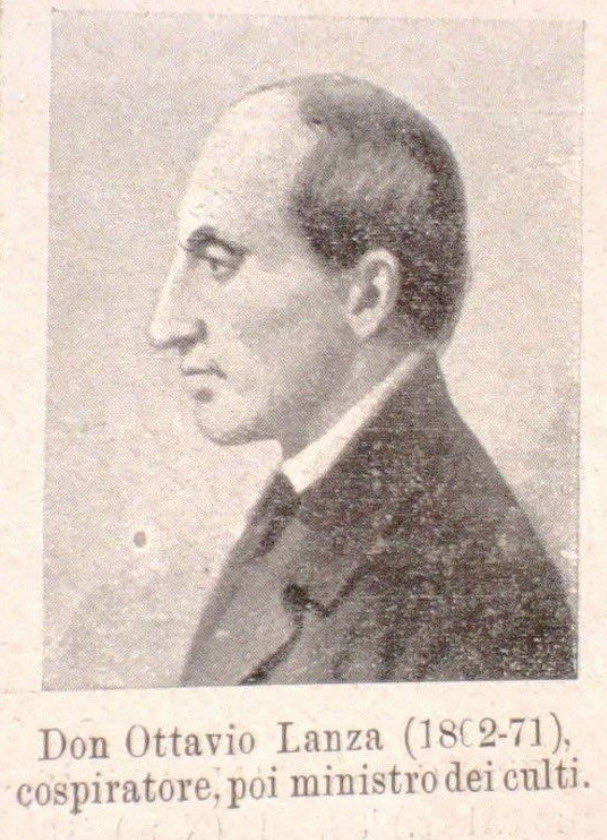
Padre Ottavio Lanza

Riso and his circle of aristocratic friends began meeting covertly in his palace as well as the house of Padre Ottavio Lanza (1824–1871), a dedicated liberal and member of the aristocratic Trabìa family, who led the group of young aristocratic revolutionaries. Lanza was frail and in poor health but a fierce advocate for the overthrow of the Bourbons. The conspirators would lay out a card table so that they could pretend to be playing cards if raided by the police and began conspiring to collect arms and ammunition for a rebellion.

In October 1859 Maniscalco was stabbed by a hired assassin in a false beard, who escaped. Maniscalco survived with a superficial wound and suspected that Riso and co-conspirators were behind the attempt, but could find no proof.

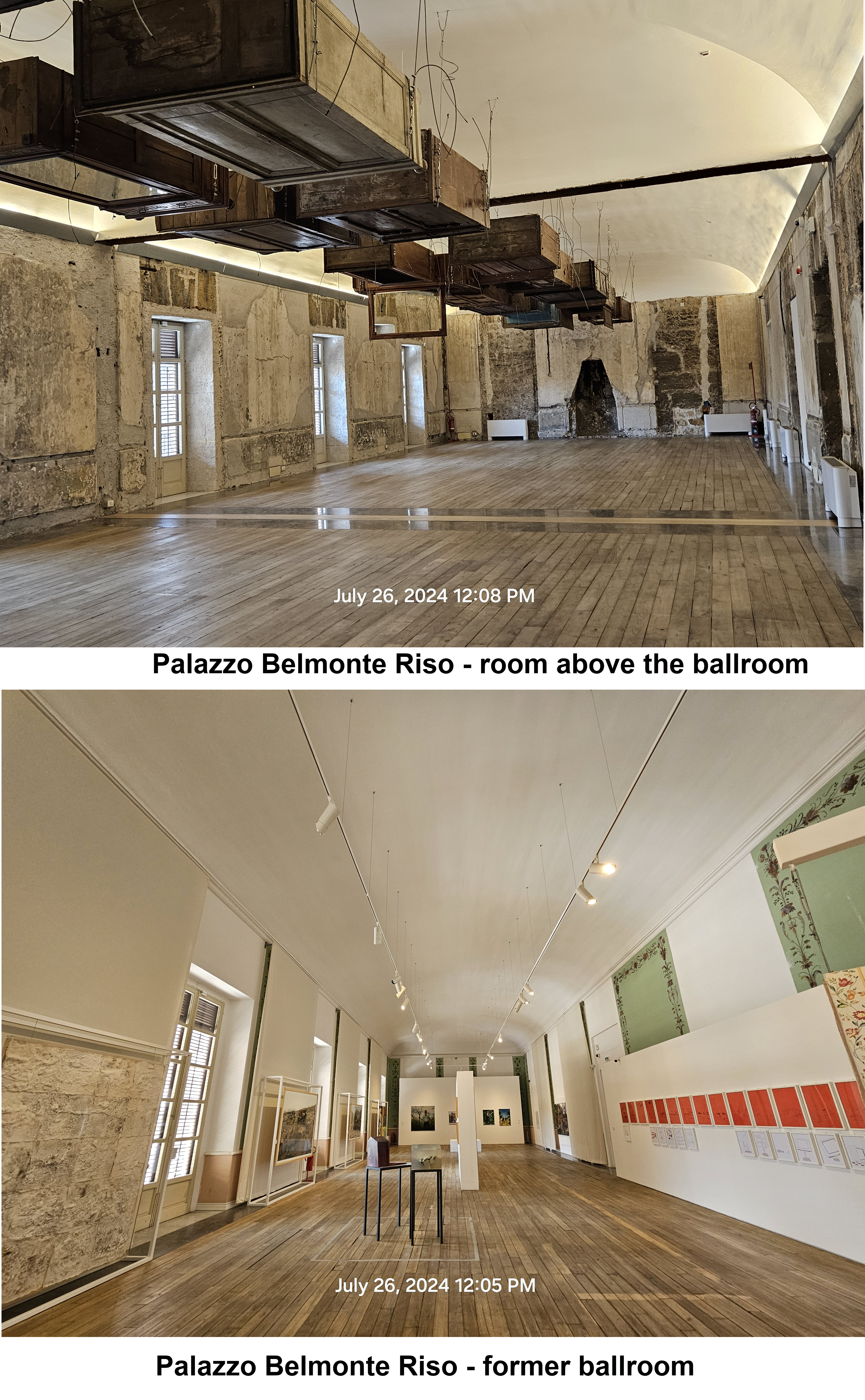
Palazzo Belmonte-Riso, ballroom and room above

In Palermo it was the custom for a few of the biggest palaces to host a “novena” for the nine days before Christmas, where aristocratic society was hosted at fancy dress balls. In December 1859, the Baron and Baroness Riso hosted their novena. According to Brancaccio “We young conspirators did not lose our youthful high spirits, though feverishly active collecting arms and spreading revolutionary propaganda. The novena at the Palazzo Riso was a brilliant affair and for nine consecutive nights we gave ourselves up to the giddiness of the ballroom floor. However, between one polka and another we went up to the floor above and, while below us in the gilded ballroom lords and ladies were swirling to the music of a Strauss waltz, we were casting bullets and rolling cartridges. There was also a small printing press to produce revolutionary propaganda flyers. The police were completely deceived.

This period in Palermo is described in the novel “Il Gattopardo” by Giuseppe Tomasi di Lampedusa, later made into a film "Il Gattopardo" ("The Leopard") by Lucchino Visconti. One of Riso’s aristocratic friends and co-conspirators, Corrado Valguarnera (later Prince of Niscemi), was one of several models for the character Tancredi in the book and film. His mother was a sister of the Prince of Lampedusa, prototype of the Leopard, and Tomasi’s great-grandfather.

=== Palermo (1860s-1870s) ===
In February 1860, Enrico Benza, an emissary from Cavour, arrived in Palermo to meet with the aristocratic revolutionaries. He counseled them to revolt but only when success was certain, which would allow the government of Vittorio Emanuele to intervene. Benza aroused the suspicion of the police who reported his meetings with the young revolutionaries to Naples. In March 1860 Mazzini sent his famous letter to the conspirators where he urged them to “dare to revolt, you will be followed, but dare in the name of National Unity.”

Baron Riso and his aristocratic co-conspirators joined forces with the established revolutionary committee. Baron Riso became the treasurer and financier of the combined group and set up a fund to pay for the planned revolt. With funds contributed by Baron Riso, they bought guns in the countryside because the police had confiscated all in Palermo. A Swiss ironmonger in Palermo made Orsini bombs based on the clay model left by Crispi several months earlier.

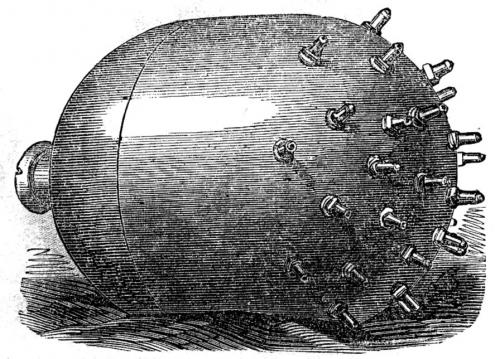
Orsini bomb, made in Sicily and paid for by Baron Riso, intended for use in the Gancia Revolt

However, “the gentlemen who labored at the press and manufactured the bombs were acting with courage, but a more reckless daring was needed to go out into the street and be shot down by the soldiers, and this was found only in Francesco Riso the plumber and the few score workmen whom he inspired.”

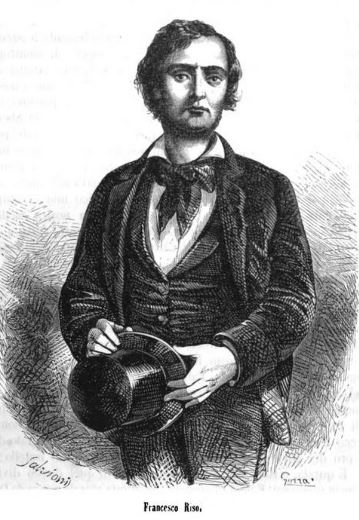
Francesco Riso, patriot of the Gancia Revolt, Palermo Sicily (c. 1850s)

Francesco Riso (1826–1860), unrelated to Baron Riso, became active in the revolutionary committee. He was a middle-class master plumber and mason, intelligent, and a dedicated and fearless follower of Mazzini and had plotted against the Bourbons since the failed 1848 revolt. He led a group of about 30 revolutionaries. At Francesco Riso's urging, the revolutionary committee established the date of the revolt as April 4, 1860. The revolt was to begin on the firing of mortars as a signal from a central plaza of the city [today the Piazza Rivoluzione], Francesco Riso would lead a revolt from the Gancia monastery, and two other groups would descend on the city from surrounding neighborhoods, initiating a popular uprising.

The police suspected something was afoot. On April 2 they searched the Palazzo Riso. They confiscated Baron Riso's personal arms, even though he had a permit. Baron Riso became alarmed for his future and turned over to Padre Lanza the committee's funds to pay the insurrectionists.

On April 3, Baron Riso and his aristocratic co-conspirators gathered at the palace of Prince Pignatelli to await the results of the revolt, ready to form a provisional government if it was successful, as Baron Riso's father Pietro had done after the 1848 revolt.

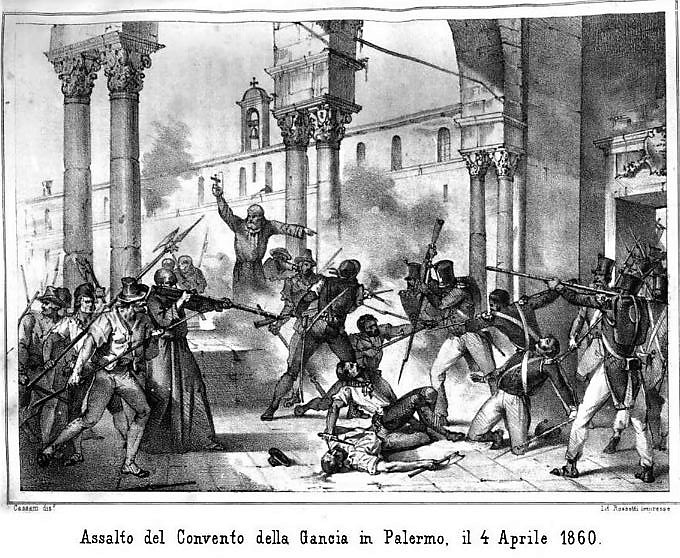
Gancia Revolt, April 4, 1860, Palermo

However the Bourbon authorities with their efficient network of spies and informers were well prepared. Bourbon troops had been stationed throughout the city. On the morning of April 4, troops prevented the firing of the signal mortars, and the revolt was crushed almost before it began. The troops stormed the Gancia monastery. Francesco Riso's compatriots were killed or captured, and he was mortally wounded, arrested and died in hospital on April 27, 1860. The Bourbon troops sacked the monastery and arrested and imprisoned the friars as accomplices. Neither the populace nor the aristocracy took part in the fight, although Baron Riso and other nobles went about the streets urging people to rise, and promising the aid of an armament from Piedmont. By eight o'clock all was over.

==== Arrest and imprisonment ====
On the morning of April 7, Maniscalco sent police to arrest Baron Riso, Prince Antonio Pignatelli (1827–1881), Prince Giardinelli (1839–1908), and Cavaliere Giovanni Notarbartolo (1837–1912). An additional co-conspirator, Corrado Valguarnera Prince of Niscemi (1838–1903), was not on the arrest warrant but insisted on remaining with them and was arrested as well. They were handcuffed and marched to the Vicaria prison on foot, surrounded by soldiers, and placed in solitary confinement. On April 8 Gabriele Colonna, duca di Cesarò (1841–1878) was arrested. Padre Lanza, weak and in poor health, sought sanctuary on the American clipper ship “Taconnay” at anchor in Palermo harbor. On April 11, Maniscalco sent police to arrest him, and the American consul Henry Barstow (1823–1875) ordered the crew to allow the arrest. Padre Lanza was placed in solitary confinement with the other aristocratic conspirators. Outraged American and British residents made a formal protest to the U.S. authorities, and Barstow was reassigned.

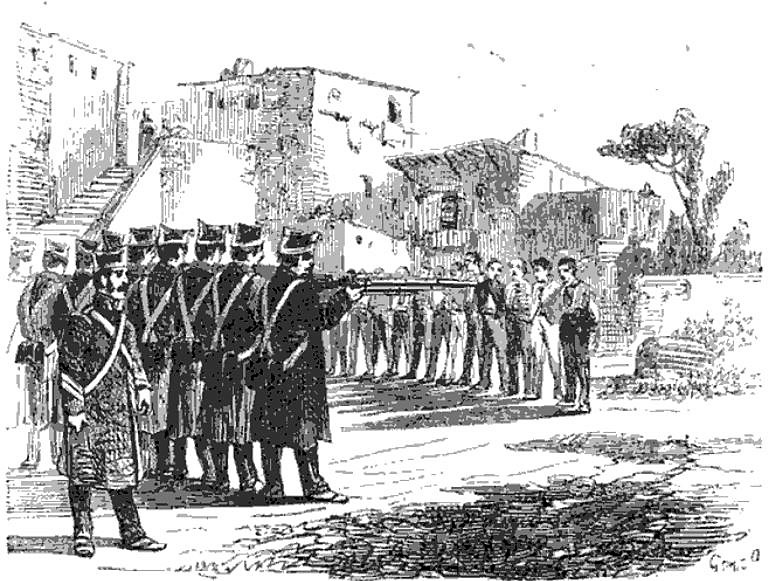
Gancia Revolt: execution of the 13 victims, April 14, 1860

On April 14 twelve men arrested at the Gancia revolt plus the father of Francesco Riso, who was not involved in the revolt, were condemned to death by a military court without defense. They were executed by firing squad in public in an open field, which Maniscalco intended as a warning and an example. An obelisk was erected in their honor in what is now known as the Piazza XIII Vittime [Plaza of the Thirteen Victims].

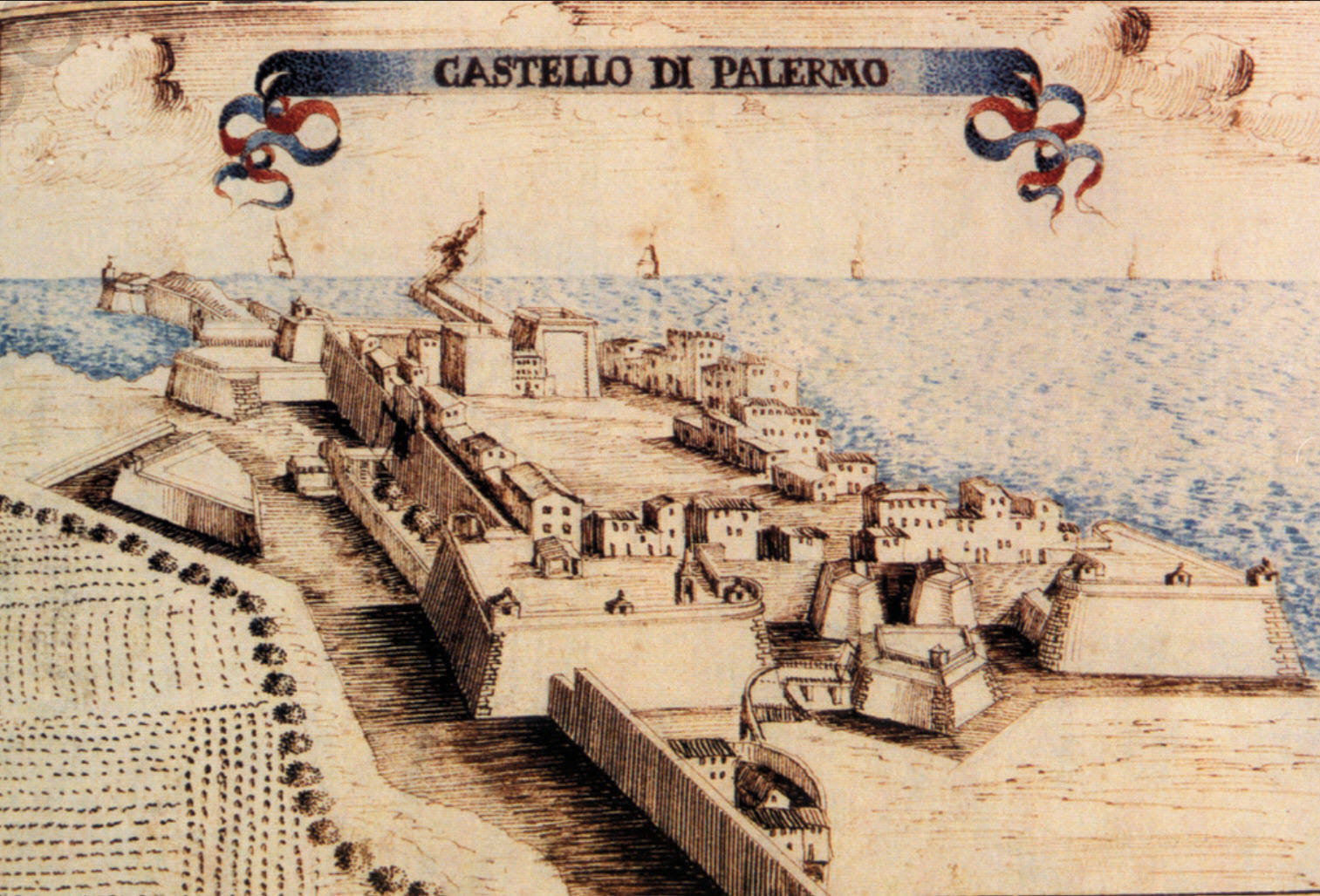
Castellammare Fort and Prison, Palermo

Maniscalco wanted to try Baron Riso and his fellow prisoners for complicity in a military court, which would have meant a death sentence to be carried out without delay. On May 21, the prisoners were moved to the Castellamare prison, and there were rumors that their execution was imminent. The wives of Riso, Prince Pignatelli, and mother of Prince Niscemi appealed to the British Admiral Rodney Mundy (1805–1884) requesting that he intercede to free the political prisoners, who were “innocent as lambs”. Mundy was skeptical but spoke with Bourbon General Ferdinando Lanza (1788–1865) who promised that the prisoners’ lives would be spared. In fact the prisoners’ courageous attorney, Marchese Giuseppe Maurigi [future supreme court justice] convinced the authorities of the absolute illegality of Maniscalco's proposed prosecution. The very high social position of the aristocratic prisoners was truly what saved them. They were referred to the ordinary courts, and the investigation had not been completed when Garibaldi entered Palermo. They were held in the Castellammare fortress prison until their release on June 19, as negotiated by Garibaldi.

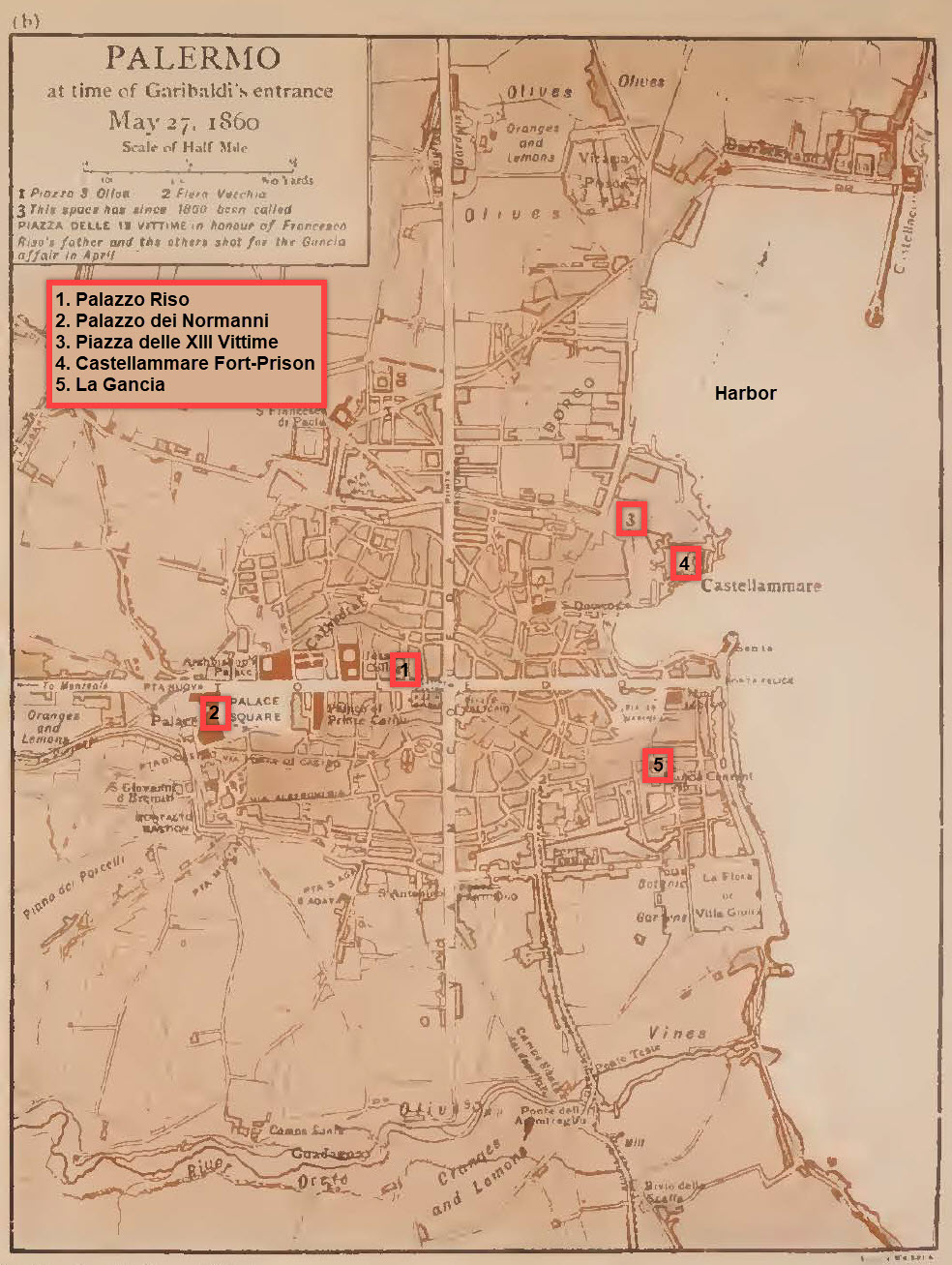
Map of Palermo at the time of Garibaldi's entrance May 27, 1860

On May 5, 1860, Garibaldi and 1,041 dedicated veterans (the “Mille”, the “Thousand”) departed from Quarto near Genoa on two paddlewheel steamships, the “Piemonte” and the “Lombardo”. On May 11 they disembarked in Marsala under the watchful eye of the British Navy. On the way to Palermo, they picked up local support and on May 15 won a battle against the Bourbon troops at Calatafimi where, after Garibaldi's General Nino Bixio was ready to give up, Garibaldi replied defiantly “Here we make Italy, or we die”.

Garibaldi moved on for the Siege of Palermo from May 27 to 30. There were five Bourbon warships anchored off Castellamare, along with fifteen foreign warships in the harbor - British, American, Spanish, Austrian, French, and Piedmontese. Behind them were some hundred merchant ships crowded with refugees. As Garibaldi reached the heart of the city, the Bourbon warships opened fire indiscriminately and the big guns of the Castellammare fired at regular intervals. Severe street-fighting continued.

British Admiral Mundy and British Consul John Goodwin (1797–1869) sought assurances from the Bourbon General Lanza and Maniscalco that British citizens and property would not be harmed. During the meeting Maniscalco asked Goodwin “if he did not think a population deserved to be annihilated should they rise up in insurrection against the constituted authorities”. To which Goodwin replied that “when a people were tyrannized they had an inherent right to take up arms and fight against their oppressors” which astonished Maniscalco.

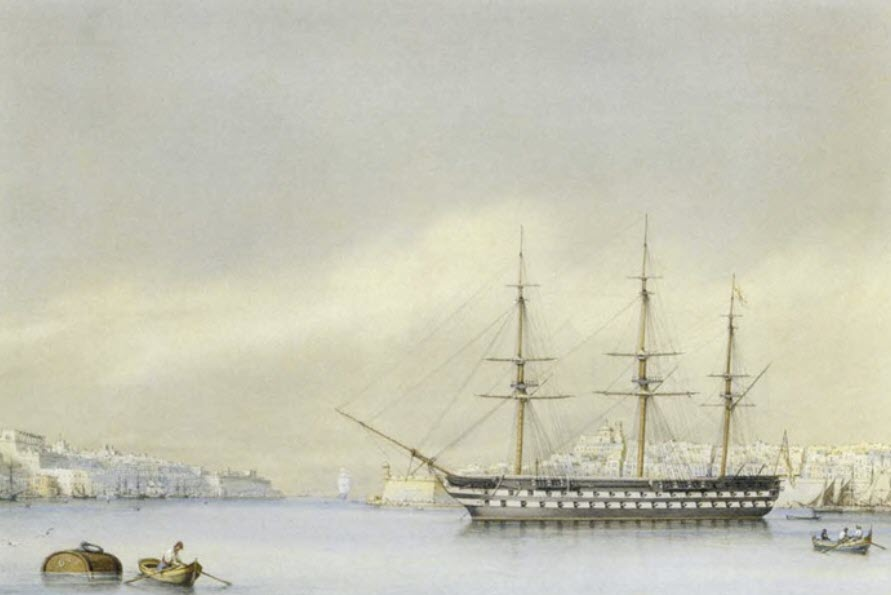
HMS Hannibal, 91-gun Flagship of British Admiral Mundy 1860

On May 30 General Lanza sought the mediation of British Admiral Mundy and proposed a meeting on Mundy's 91-gun flagship, the HMS "Hannibal", where Garibaldi and Bourbon General Giuseppe Letizia (1794–1880) negotiated a settlement. The Bourbons withdrew their 20,000 troops by sea during June 7 to 19. The Bourbons turned over the Palermo mint to Garibaldi, which provided him funds to continue his march. Riso and the other political prisoners were released as the last of the Bourbon troops departed including General Lanza and Maniscalco, who died in exile in Marseille in 1864 still plotting a restoration of the Bourbon monarchy.

==== Release from prison ====
When the troops had left, the Castellamare fort and prison was last of all handed over to Garibaldi, together with the political prisoners. “Since these were non other than Baron Riso and the young nobles arrested on April 7, the most popular citizens in Palermo since that hour, it would clearly be necessary to carry them in triumph up the Toledo.”

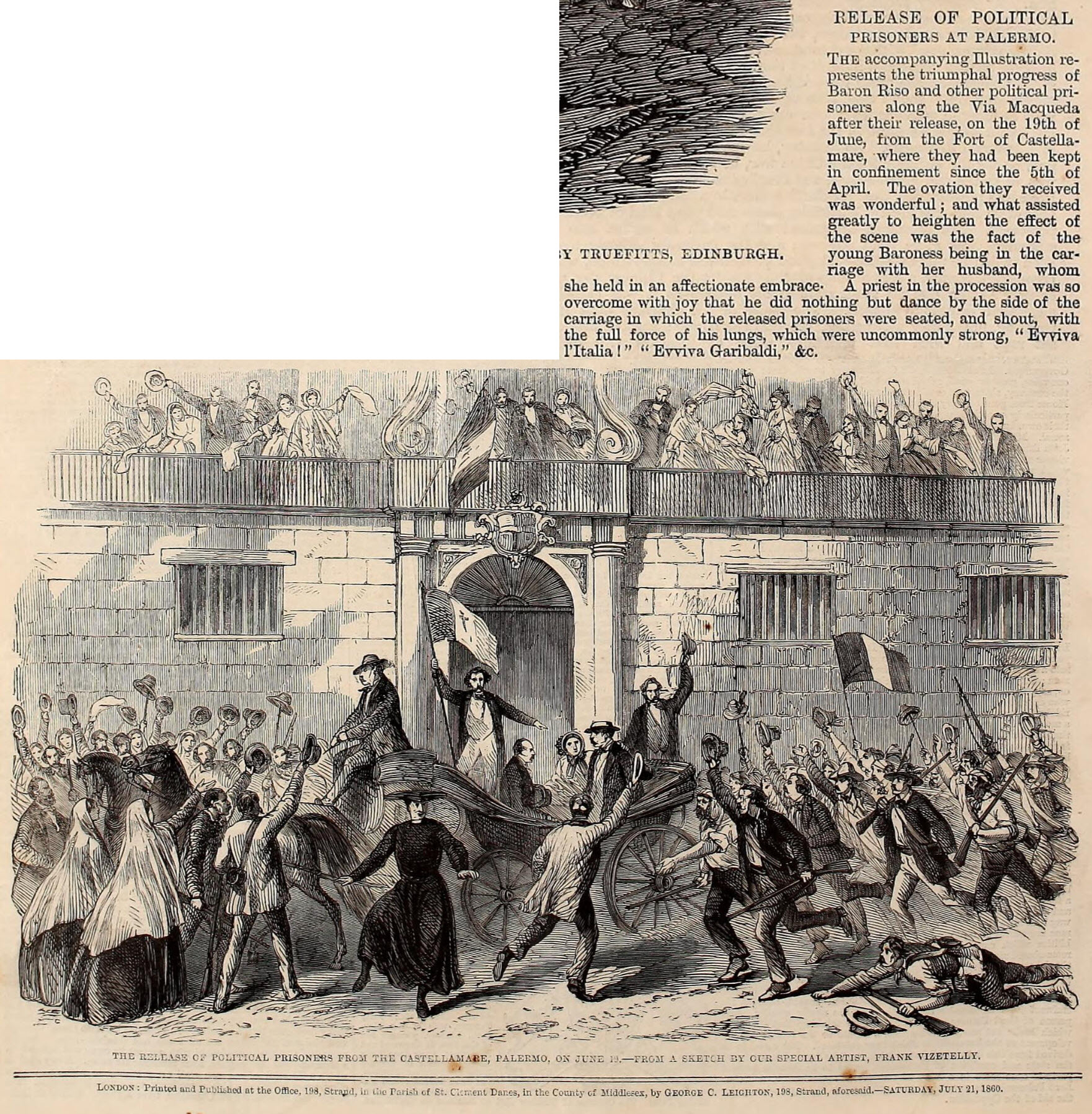
The release of Baron Riso and other political prisoners from Castellamare prison Palermo, June 19, 1860

Garibaldi stood gazing at the city from his temporary quarters in the Palazzo dei Normanni. “While from the sea up the length of the Toledo, gay with flags and flowers, was heard ever nearer the joyful roar of the people as they came bringing the released prisoners to present them to the Liberator. When the young men, with the parents and families at length came into his presence, tears stood in his eyes, and it was some minutes before he could find voice to answer their words of gratitude.” Garibaldi wrote: “I was overwhelmed with gratitude by them, and could not restrain my own tears.” Alexandre Dumas père, who had joined Garibaldi as a war correspondent, wrote: “As soon as the liberated prisoners had left Garibaldi, they came to pay me a visit, accompanied by their mothers, their wives, and their sisters. The wife of one of them, the Baroness Riso, is the daughter of my old and worthy friend Hallay, the referee in all affairs of honour.”

After the establishment of the Kingdom of Italy, Riso served as an aide-de-camp, in charge of ordinance, to General Ignazio De Genova di Pettinengo (1813–1896) during his term as governor of Sicily in 1861–62. Pettinengo was a trusted officer of the Savoy military, appointed by Vittorio Emanuele II. In the 1860s, Riso also served as an Officer of the Guides for Vittorio Emanuele II.

In November 1866, Riso's wife returned to Paris and left her daughter with her husband. On the way, she had an audience with King Vittorio Emanuele II in Florence as the wife of an Officer of the Guides of the King. Based on society-page references that include references to her mother and sister, she lived in Paris and Nice.

In 1870 Riso was elected a Delegate in the IX Legislature representing the fourth district of Palermo, which met in Florence at the Palazzo della Signoria for the first session in 1870–71, and in Rome at the Palazzo Montecitorio for the 1871–72, after Rome became the capital of Italy. Riso resigned his post in 1872 to return to private life to manage his business interests.

=== Carlentini (1870s) ===
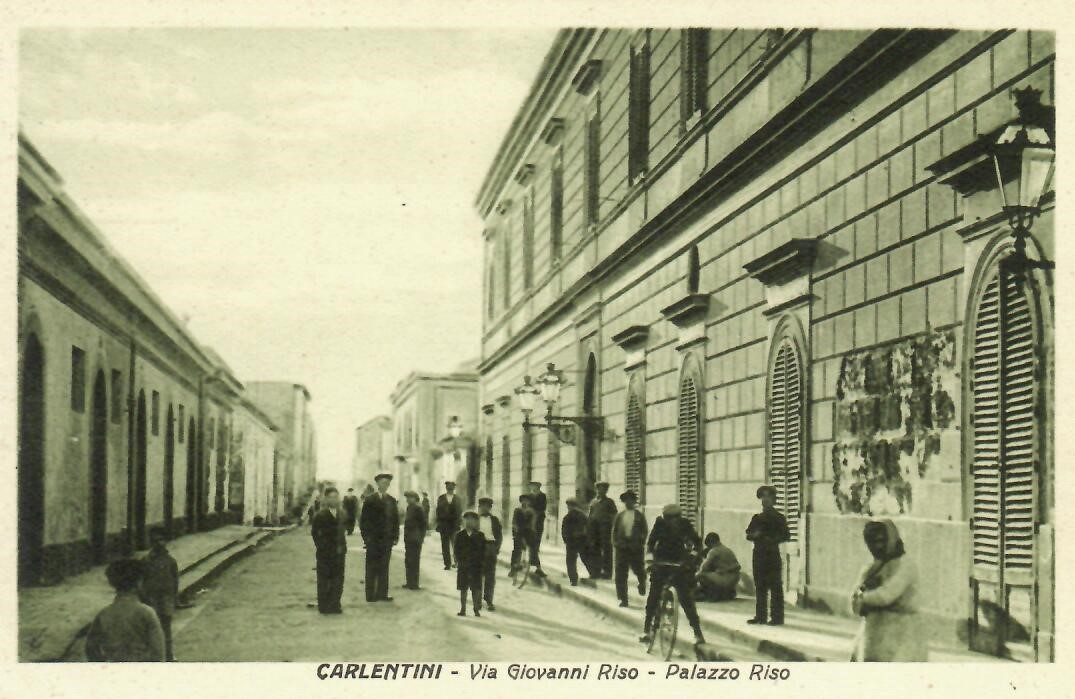
Palazzo Riso, Carlentini, c. 1930s

In the early 1870s, Riso built his palace in Carlentini overlooking his Feudo Murgo (9 square miles). He spent most of his remaining life at his “hermitage”, as he called it, managing his business and agricultural affairs. The Palazzo Riso was built on the site of a former Cistercian monastery and incorporated the small Church of Santa Maria di Roccadia. The palace had over 60 rooms with a panoramic terrace from which Riso could survey his estate. The palace had an arms room and a hall of mirrors decorated with frescoes by Ettore De Maria Bergler (1850–1938) an Art Nouveau painter who also decorated the palaces of the Whitaker and Florio families in Palermo. Bergler's father worked as an administrator for Riso, and Riso supported Bergler financially during his art studies in Naples and in Palermo where he studied with the painter Francesco Lojacono (1838–1915), who fought with Garibaldi's Mille. Riso's palazzo surrounded a park, named Villa Luisa after his daughter.

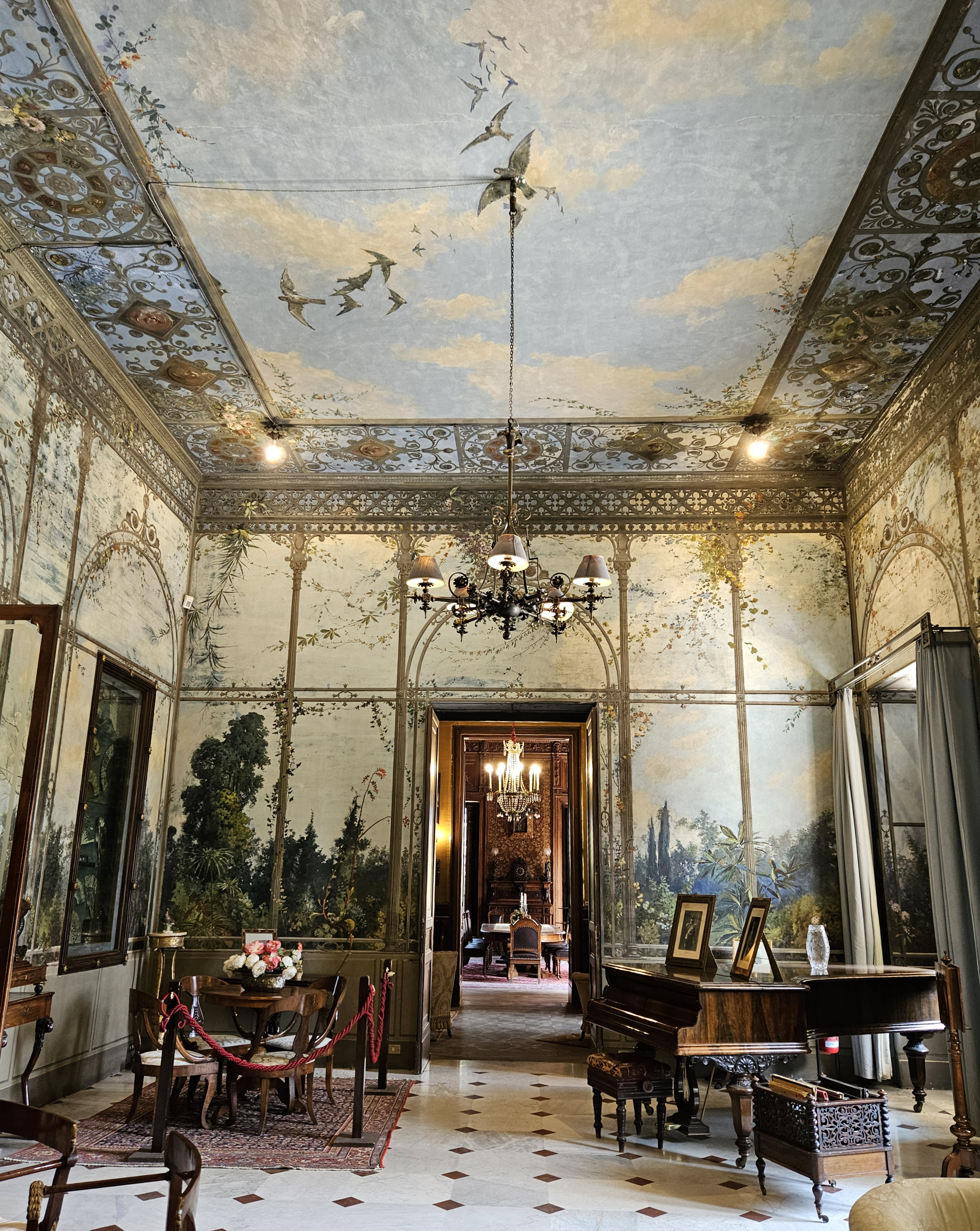
Example of interior trompe-l'oeil fresco by Ettore Bergler. Villa Malfitano-Whitaker, Palermo, c. 1880s. Perhaps Bergler's decoration for the interior of Palazzo Riso was similar.

Riso served as an advisor to the city administration of Carlentini. He was a generous benefactor to the poor and supported young people in learning a trade or profession. He planned to donate a hospital but died suddenly before it could be established.

=== Death and burial ===
In September 1901, Riso learned that he had a fatal illness and returned from Carlentini to Palermo, where he died on November 7, 1901, “after a painful illness for which he had been suffering for a month”. Riso was buried in the same tomb as his father at the Cemetery of Santa Maria di Gesù in Palermo.

A funeral monograph included four encomiums from his friends and employees in Carlentini:

- “Without pretensions, without ulterior motives, without ambitions of any kind, he participated in the conspiracy and then withdrew to private life, content to have fulfilled his duty. His charity works, his daily donations for the needy of our city leave unforgettable memories of his virtue and his generosity of spirit. Carlentini has lost its first citizen, but the poor of Carlentini have lost their father, their benefactor. That being who, full of health, and with the vigor of an exceptional physical constitution, seemed to have been able to defy time!"–Carmelo Scavonetti, Mayor of Carlentini
- “He had a clear vision of his death almost a month before he died, when he was in good condition. Goodbye sea, goodbye vineyards, mountains, olive groves, ... I will not see you again, and weeping, addressing his courteous greeting to all the workers, with a silent and eloquent handshake to his employees, he left, on the last day of September 21st, never to return.” Referring to Riso “you were virtuous because you possessed the gifts that the supreme Aristotle assigned to virtue: prudence, temperance, fortitude and justice; you were a virtuous man, because you refused honors and offices.” Dr. G. Matarazzo Carveni
- "While still young he needed to express the irrepressible motions of his soul and confided his deeds to history; later he had the opportunity to forgive debts, he gave alms openly and covertly, he forgave and forgot the offenses suffered, he paid for the education, in addition to me, a modest land surveyor, others among whom there is a glory of Italian painting, he was the consoling angel of needy families. He drew from the fountain of charity the inexhaustible resources of his Christian heart, he had a favor for everyone, he had admonitions, he had smiles. I will not forget the last word addressed to me when, slumped his body, his soul, foresaw the passage to eternity near. He said 'thank you' perhaps because I had made it my duty to keep him company, to always remember the benefit obtained, perhaps because he foresaw that my weak prayer would be for him in the terrible moments of death."–Sebastiano Zarbano
- "Oh! I would like to recall a hundred anecdotes to illustrate still more, the life of the great benefactor. I only say that Baron Riso died as he lived. Each of his last acts, each of his last words was the expression of one of his virtues, was like the seal that he placed on his life. Thus he disappeared from the world."–Francesco Votino, winemaker in the administration of Baron Riso

After his death, his daughter Maria Luisa inherited his estate. After her death in 1922, the estate passed to his son Domenico (possibly adopted).

In the 1930s the Palazzo Riso in Carlentini and the Feudo Murgo were sold at auction and broken up. Sometime after the 1960s, the Palazzo Riso in Carlentini, which had served as a school and governmental office since the 1930s, was razed and replaced with residential buildings, with only the small Church of Santa Maria di Roccadia remaining.

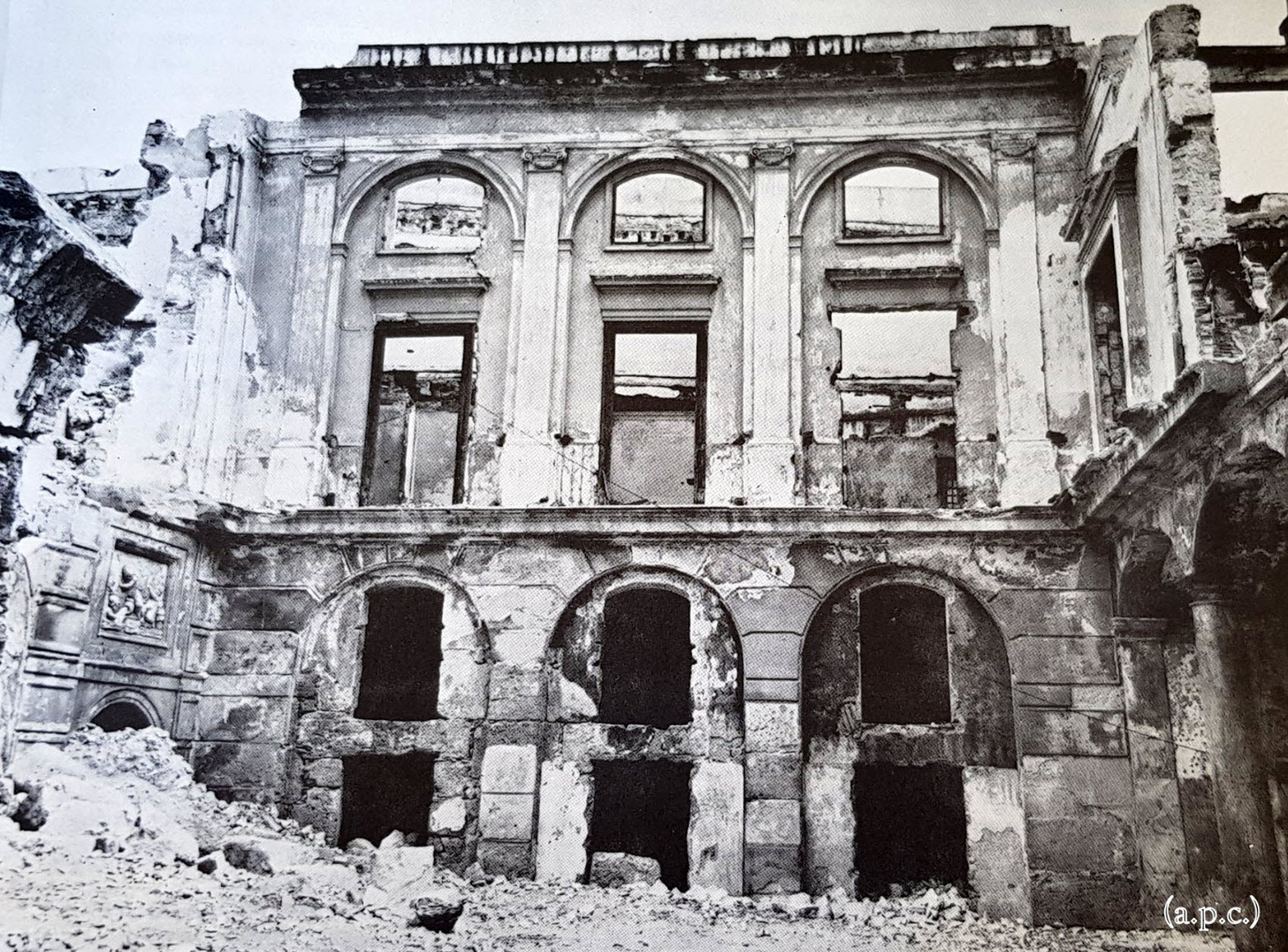
Palazzo Riso, interior courtyard after Allied bombing in 1943

In 1935 the Palazzo Belmonte Riso in Palermo, which no longer belonged to the Riso family, became the Palermo headquarters for the Fascist party of Italy. In 1943 during WWII, the building was heavily bombed by the Allies, which destroyed interior frescoes in the front ballroom section of the building and demolished virtually all of the remaining building. The property lay in ruins until 1980 when it was acquired by the regional government of Sicily. Beginning in 1997 the building was remodeled as the Palermo Museum of Contemporary Art, the “RISO”, which opened in 2005.
