= Taravella =

Taravella may refer to:

- Alain Taravella (born 1948), French billionaire
- Croce Taravella, Italian painter
- Ingeniero Aeronáutico Ambrosio L.V. Taravella International Airport, International Airport in Córdoba
- J. P. Taravella High School, secondary school in Coral Springs, Florida
