= Palazzo Riso =

Contemporary art museum in Palermo, Italy

Coordinates: 38°06′55″N 13°21′36″E

RISO, Museo d’Arte Contemporanea della Sicilia
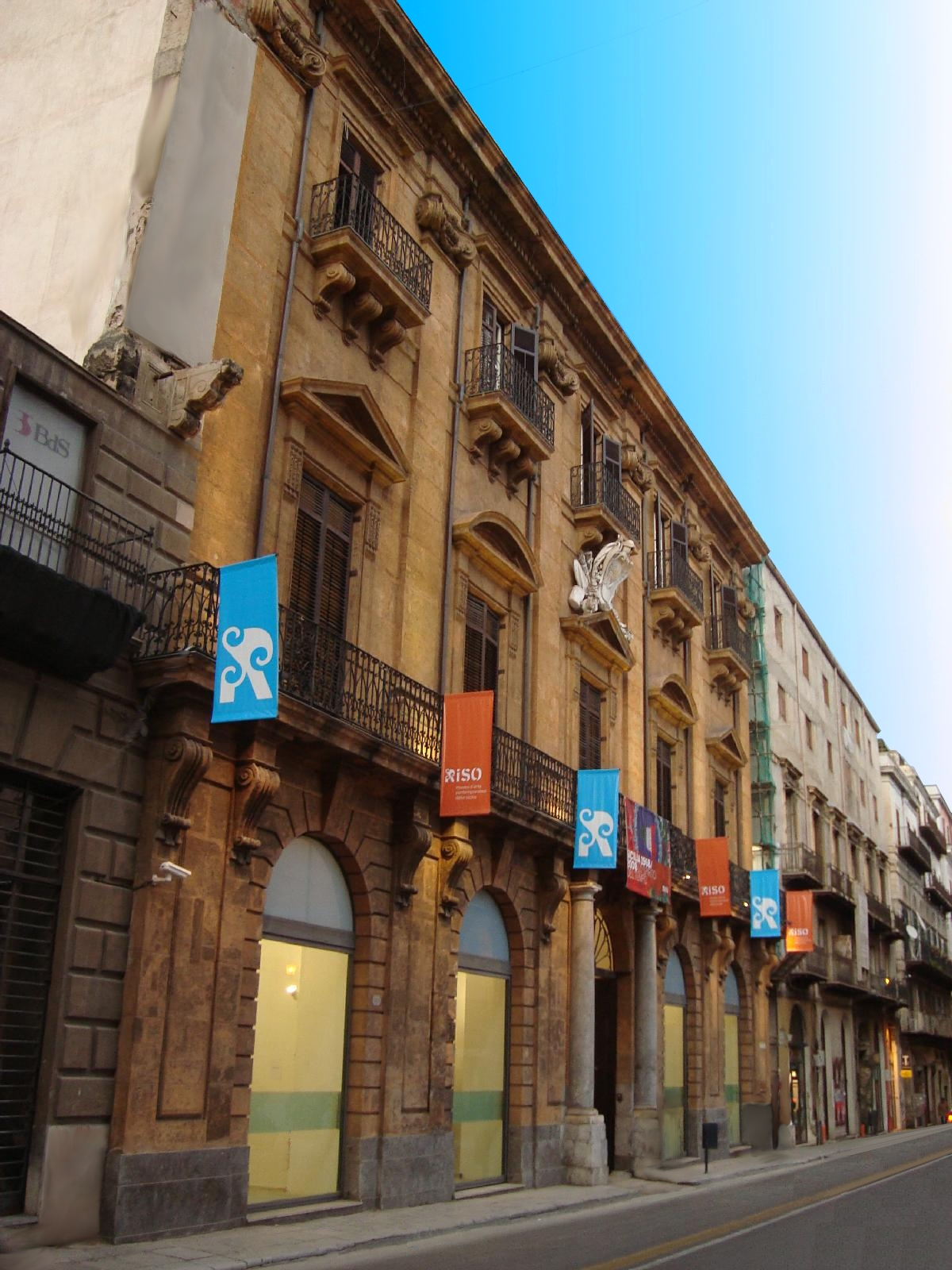
- Established: 2008
- Location: Corso Vittorio Emanuele 365; 90134 Palermo, Italy
- Director: Valeria Li Vigni
- Website: www.poloartecontemporanea.it/museo_Riso/

The Palazzo Riso, officially RISO, Museo d'Arte Contemporanea della Sicilia ("RISO, Contemporary Art Museum of Sicily") and also known as Palazzo Belmonte Riso, is a regional contemporary art museum located in the ancient Corso Vittorio Emanuele, Palermo, Italy.

== History and architecture ==
The Palazzo Riso's architecture clearly shows the final days of Sicilian Baroque as it was transformed into Neoclassicism. Designed by the architect Giuseppe Venanzio Marvuglia, the house was constructed at the end of the 18th century and completed in 1784. It became property of the Prince of Belmonte, and in the 19th century it passed to Baron Riso. The marble Riso coat of arms on the portal of the palazzo was carved by Ignazio Marabitti.

During World War II the building was damaged by Allied bombing. Restored from the mid-1990s, since 2008 it has become a contemporary art museum.

== The museum ==
The Riso Contemporary Art Museum of Sicily is one of the most important museums in the region.

The museum collects works by contemporary artists including Andrea Di Marco, Alessandro Bazan, Giovanni Anselmo, Emilio Isgrò, Domenico Mangano, Antonio Sanfilippo, Carla Accardi, Christian Boltanski, Croce Taravella, Francesco De Grandi, Francesco Simeti, Fulvio Di Piazza, Giulia Piscitelli, Laboratorio Saccardi, Luca Vitone, Paola Pivi, Pietro Consagra, Richard Long, Richard T. Scott, and Salvo.

== See also ==
- Giuseppe Venanzio Marvuglia

== Bibliography ==
- Lóránd Hegyi (curated by). Essential Experiences. Milano, Mondadori Electa, 2009, pp. 165. ISBN 978-88-370-7389-3
- AAVV. Passaggi in Sicilia: la collezione di Riso e oltre. Milano, Skira, 2009, pp 191. ISBN 978-88-7624-723-1
- AAVV. Sicilia 1968/2008 Lo spirito del tempo. Milano, Silvana, 2009. pp151. ISBN 978-88-366-1340-3
- AAVV. I luoghi dell'arte. Riso/Annex. I quaderni di Riso. Milano, Mondadori Electa, 2010, pp. 200. ISBN 978-88-370-7415-9
- AAVV. Fare musei. Riso/Annex. I quaderni di Riso. Milano, Mondadori Electa, 2011, pp. 200. ISBN 978-88-370-7527-9
