= Richard T. Scott =

American painter (born 1980)

Richard T Scott
- The Sophist Oil on Linen, 17" x 20", Painting by Richard T Scott
- Born: 1980 (age 45–46); Decatur, GA, United States
- Education: University of Georgia; New York Academy of Art; Odd Nerdrum
- Known for: Painting, Numismatics
- Patrons: Philip Anschutz, Morad El Hattab, Alan Howarth, Baron Howarth of Newport, Richard Epes and Robert C. Kennedy Ph.D
- Website: http://www.richardtscottart.com

Richard T. Scott (born 1980) is an American Renaissance painter and writer living and working between the Hudson Valley, New York and Savannah, Georgia, where he teaches at the Savannah College of Art and Design. His paintings are in the permanent collections of museums in North America, Europe, and Asia. He was formerly a member of the Artistic Infusion Program, a group of artists and illustrators contracted to design coins and Congressional Medals for the United States Mint.

== Biography ==
Scott pursued a BFA in painting in the Lamar Dodd School of Art at the University of Georgia, followed by an MFA in painting from the New York Academy of Art. After graduation he worked for two years as a painter for Jeff Koons, then three years as a studio assistant to Odd Nerdrum in Norway and Paris, France. Scott worked for the United States Mint from 2014-2018.

== Art career ==
Scott is known for his classically influenced history paintings and narrative portraits. His current body of work explores the historical origins and legacy of systemic and social discrimination as well as gun violence in American Culture. The first major piece in the series "When the Man Comes Around" is in the permanent collection of the Georgia Museum of Art. His largest work to date, "Hearts of Men" was unveiled at Paul Booth Gallery in New York City August 2016. His second major work "New Amsterdam", which traces the legacy of slavery in America from the Dutch settlers to mass incarceration, was unveiled at Spalding Nix Fine Art in Atlanta, GA in February 2018.

Donald Kuspit has said that "Adam Miller, David Molesky and Richard T. Scott are what I have called New Old Masters; that is, they use Old Master styles to mediate modern reality and to give emotional and cognitive depth to events that the mass media would treat superficially (one more momentarily hot news story, here today, gone tomorrow)".

Scott is a contributing author to The Nerdrum School, a collection of paintings and essays by students of Odd Nerdrum. Scott is a proponent of an alternative philosophical superstructure for figurative painting, which he calls a Post-contemporary paradigm, separate from that of the Contemporary Art world.

Scott has designed coins for the United States Mint: notably, the 2016 Fort Moultrie quarter. as well as the private American Mint. Richard Scott was also the first to design an African American Liberty for the U.S. Mint's 2015 High Relief coin.

In 2010, Scott told the New York Times that Facebook was censoring classical paintings of nudes, which had been deleted from the accounts of many painters as well as established institutions such as the New York Academy of Art.

Scott's work was included the book Kitsch More than Art.

== Collections ==
- New Britain Museum of American Art
- Georgia Museum of Art,
- The Museu Europeu d'Art Modern, Barcelona
- The Museum of Contemporary Art Sicily Palazzo Riso
- Sea Island, Georgia
- Adoro Museum of Art, Philippines
