= Ferdinando Lanza =

Two Sicilian general

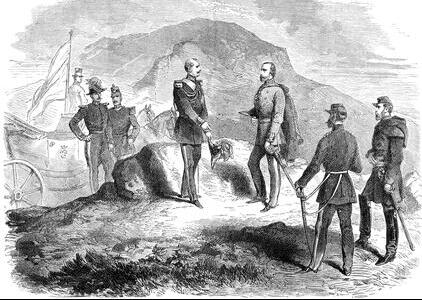
- Lanza (left) signing an armistice with Giuseppe Garibaldi (right) on May 31, 1860
- Born: April 10, 1788; Nocera dei Pagani, Principato Citra, Naples
- Died: May 21, 1865 (aged 77); Naples, Campania, Italy
- Military career
- Allegiance: Two Sicilies
- Branch: Army of the Two Sicilies
- Service years: ~1848 – 1861
- Rank: Lieutenant General
- Nickname: Lanza di Sicilia
- Conflicts: Expedition of the Thousand: Siege of Palermo (surrendered)

Ferdinando Lanza was a lieutenant-general who fought against Garibaldi's Expedition of the Thousand. During the conflict, Lanza was stationed at Palermo but surrendered after the siege on May 30, 1860.

== Early military career ==
Coming from the Cavalry, Lanza was promoted to general in 1848. His first major military action was on May 9, 1849, led him to fight against the troops of Giuseppe Garibaldi in front of Palestrina during the creation of the Roman Republic. He had brought the 7,000 men of the French division of Charles Oudinot, whose 20th battalion of the line had been overwhelmed on April 30, 1849, in a bayonet attack by the Garibaldini in the operations that led to the captures of Villa Pamphili and Villa Corsini and the Bourbon soldiers to defend the fate of the Papacy. Lanza then participated in the Bourbon reconquest expedition of the Kingdom of Sicily after the Sicilian revolution of 1848 under the orders of Carlo Filangieri.

== Expedition of the Thousand ==
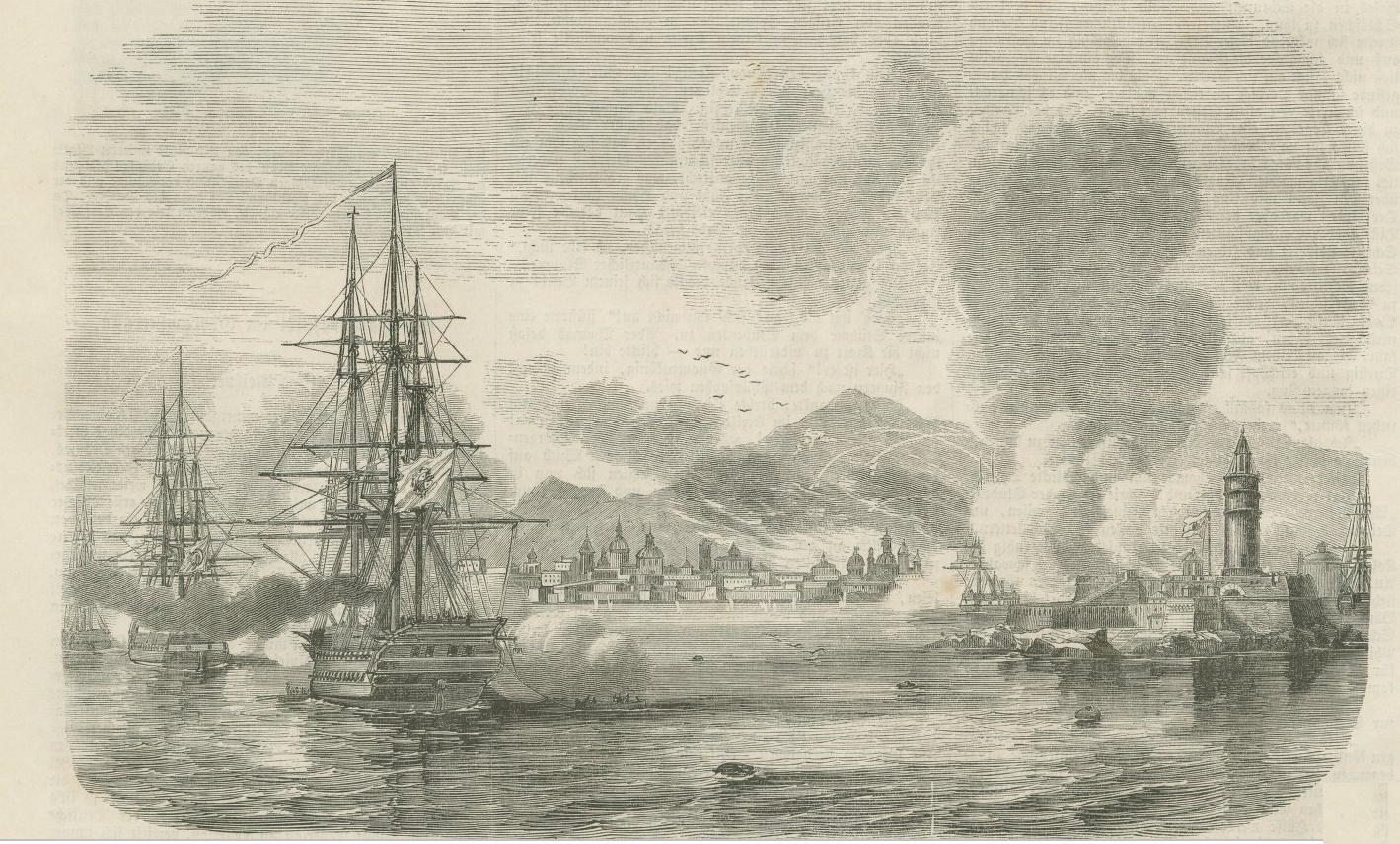
The Bombardment of Palermo by the Royal Sicilian Navy

Lanza was field marshal by then, delegated by King Francesco II of the Two Sicilies, to defend the vice-royal capital of Palermo during Giuseppe Garibaldi's Expedition of the Thousand. After the Bourbon defeat at the Battle of Calatafimi in May 1860, Lanza was appointed lieutenant general in Sicily and field commander.

At the time, now seventy-three and obese to the point of hardly being able to ride a horse, he completely misunderstood the presence of Garibaldi's soldiers on the outskirts of Palermo, and thought that Garibaldi had withdrawn towards Corleone. He was consequently found completely unprepared at the time of the siege that the Thousand and Sicilian picciotti brought across the Ponte dell'Ammiraglio over the Oreto river and the Termini Gate.

Lanza, reiterating his strategy back in the Sicilian Rebellion 11 years ago, as he had repeatedly announced for the remaining artillery and navy to bombard the city, causing the death of about 600 people and the destruction of a large number of homes.

The population of Palermo, including the clergy and nobility of the island, completely abandoned any semblance of loyalty to the Bourbon Monarchy and its army and started a riot after the bombardment of innocent civilians. The enlistment of citizens in Garibaldi's ranks became so massive as to allow Garibaldi to occupy without difficulty and in a short time the most important strategic points of the capital, forcing Lanza, despite having greater arms and equipment, to request a truce and to sign an armistice on June 6, finally re-embarking on June 19, 1860, for the Italian mainland. During the retreat from Palermo while he was reviewing his troops one of the soldiers shouted at him: Eccele', guardate quanti siamo. E dobbiamo scappare accussì?, ("Here they are, look how many we are. Why should we run away?") to which the general replied: Statti zitto, 'mbriacone! ("Be quiet drunk!"). After the end of the war, he also went to Palazzo d'Angri to pay homage to Garibaldi.
