= Siege of Palermo =

Battle of the Expedition of the Thousand

- Part of the Expedition of the Thousand
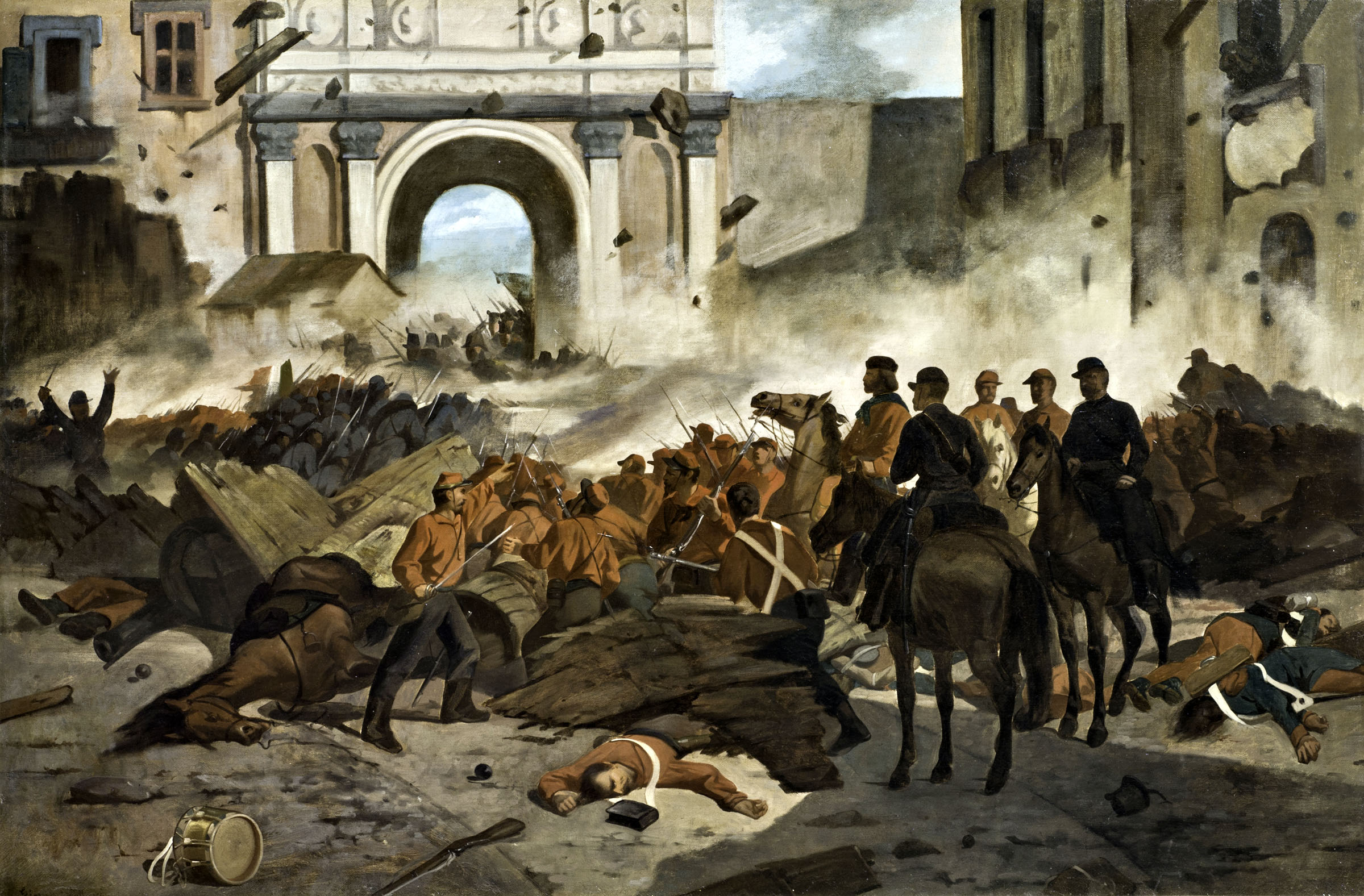
- Garibaldi in Palermo by Giovanni Fattori, c. 1860
Date	27–30 May 1860
Location	Palermo
Result	Garibaldine victory

Belligerents
(Italy) Redshirts	(Kingdom of the Two Sicilies) Two Sicilies

Commanders and leaders
Giuseppe Garibaldi	Ferdinando Lanza (surrendered)

Strength
3,750	18,000–22,000

Casualties and losses
Unknown	200 killed 800 wounded
- 600 civilians killed

The siege of Palermo took place between 27 and 30 May 1860 in Palermo, Sicily, during the Expedition of the Thousand led by Giuseppe Garibaldi against the Kingdom of the Two Sicilies, as part of the Italian unification wars.

== Battle ==
With about 750 Redshirts able to fight, along with some 3,000 picciotti (Sicilian volunteer guerrillas), on 27 May Garibaldi attacked the Sicilian capital of Palermo, held by a garrison of 18,000 to 22,000 Bourbon Army soldiers under the incompetent command of General Ferdinando Lanza. A significant portion of the 180,000 residents of Palermo rallied to Garibaldi, including about 2,000 prisoners released from local jails. On the first day of fighting, Bourbon forces were driven back from a number of key positions. Lanza then ordered the shelling of the part of the city that had been captured by Garibaldi's forces, causing the death of around 600 civilians by the end of the siege.

By May 28, Garibaldi controlled much of Palermo, and the next day his volunteers repelled a counterattack. However, with the arrival of two battalions of well-trained Bavarian mercenaries to relieve the Bourbon garrison, the battle turned against Garibaldi, whose troops were nearly out of ammunition. Nevertheless, Lanza surrendered the city on 30 May. Garibaldi sent his son Menotti to watch the garrison's surrender, and an armistice was quickly signed with the mediation of British admiral Rodney Mundy. Finally, a convention on 6 June arranged for the withdrawal by sea of about 22,000 Bourbon troops, on 19 June.

== Gallery ==
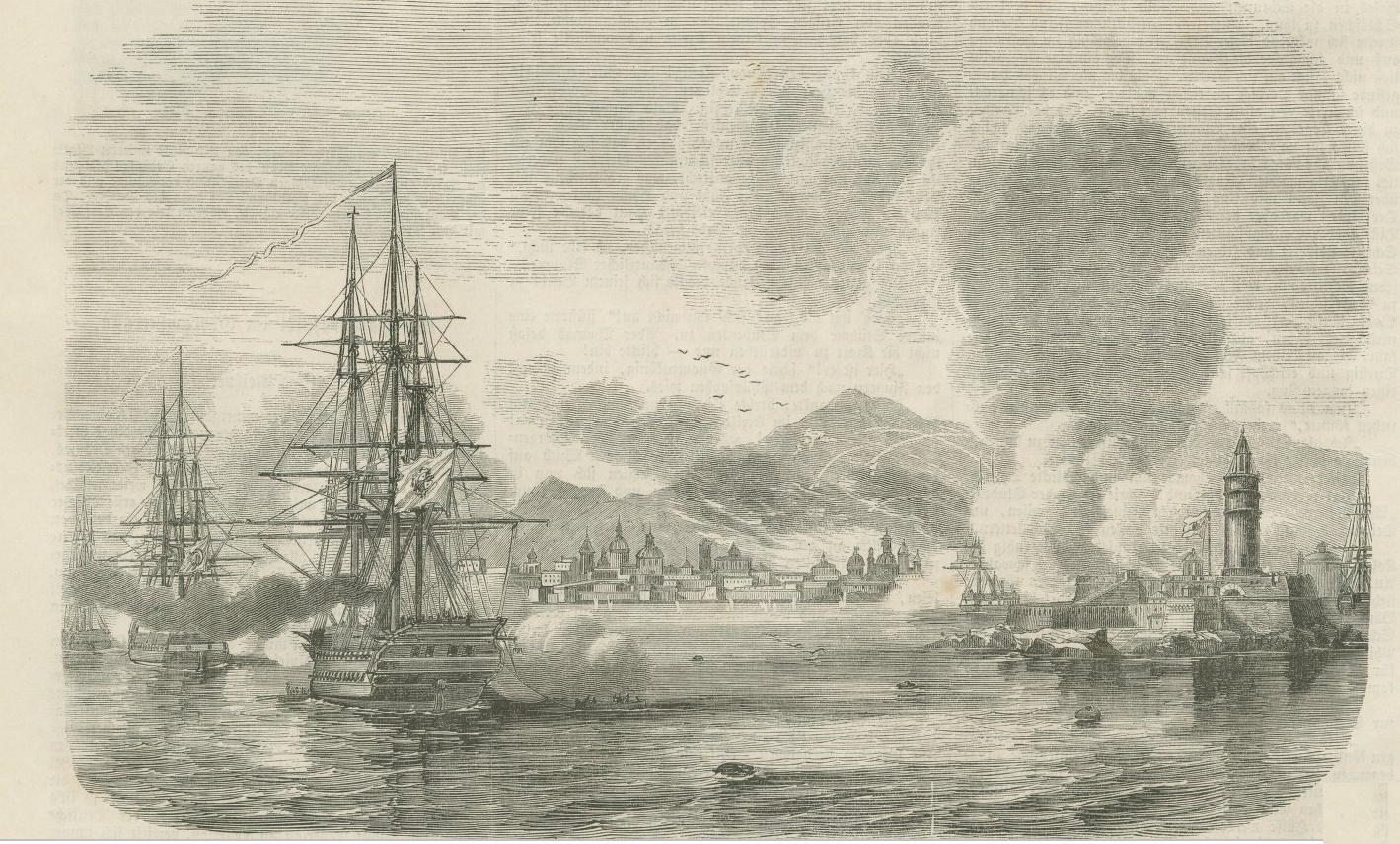
Bombardment of Palermo by General Lanza

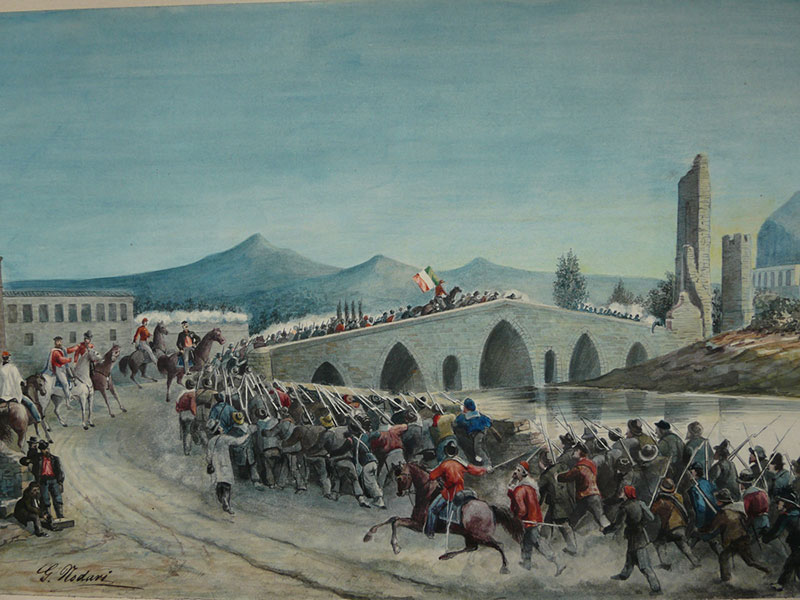
Redshirts crossing the Ponte dell'Ammiraglio

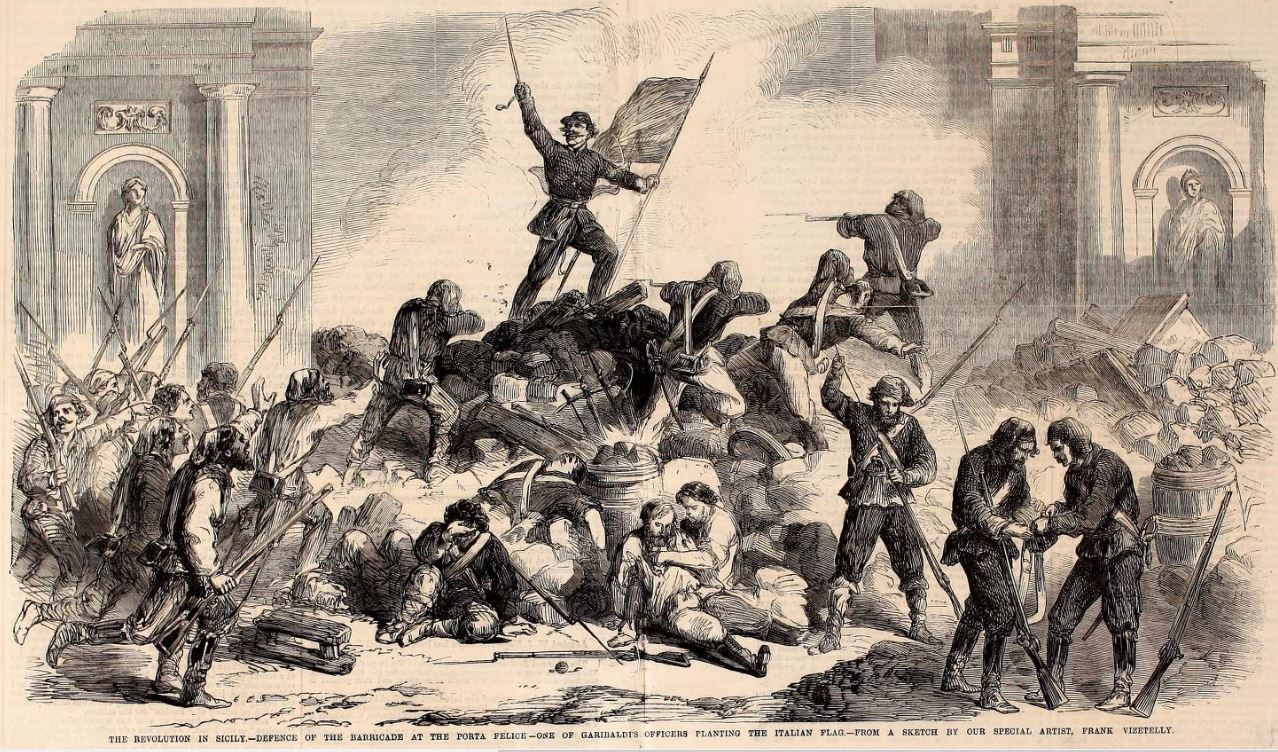
Garibaldi's volunteers defending a barricade at Porta Felice

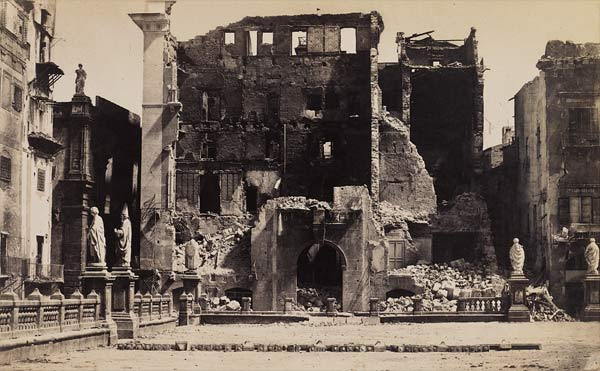
Ruins of Palazzo Carini in the aftermath of the siege

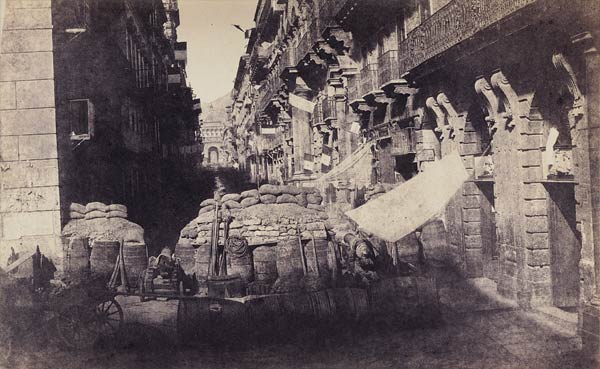
General István Türr's barricade on Via Toledo

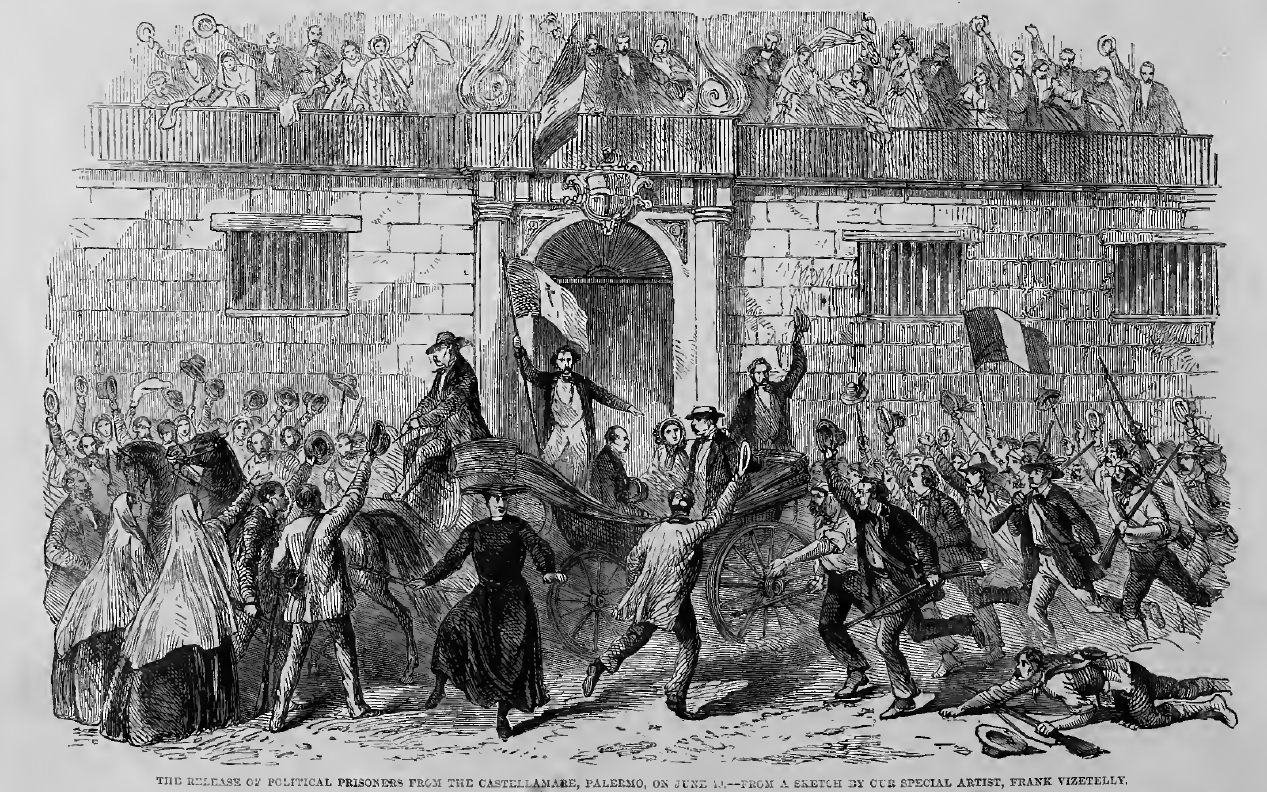
Release of political prisoners from the Castello a Mare, June 1860

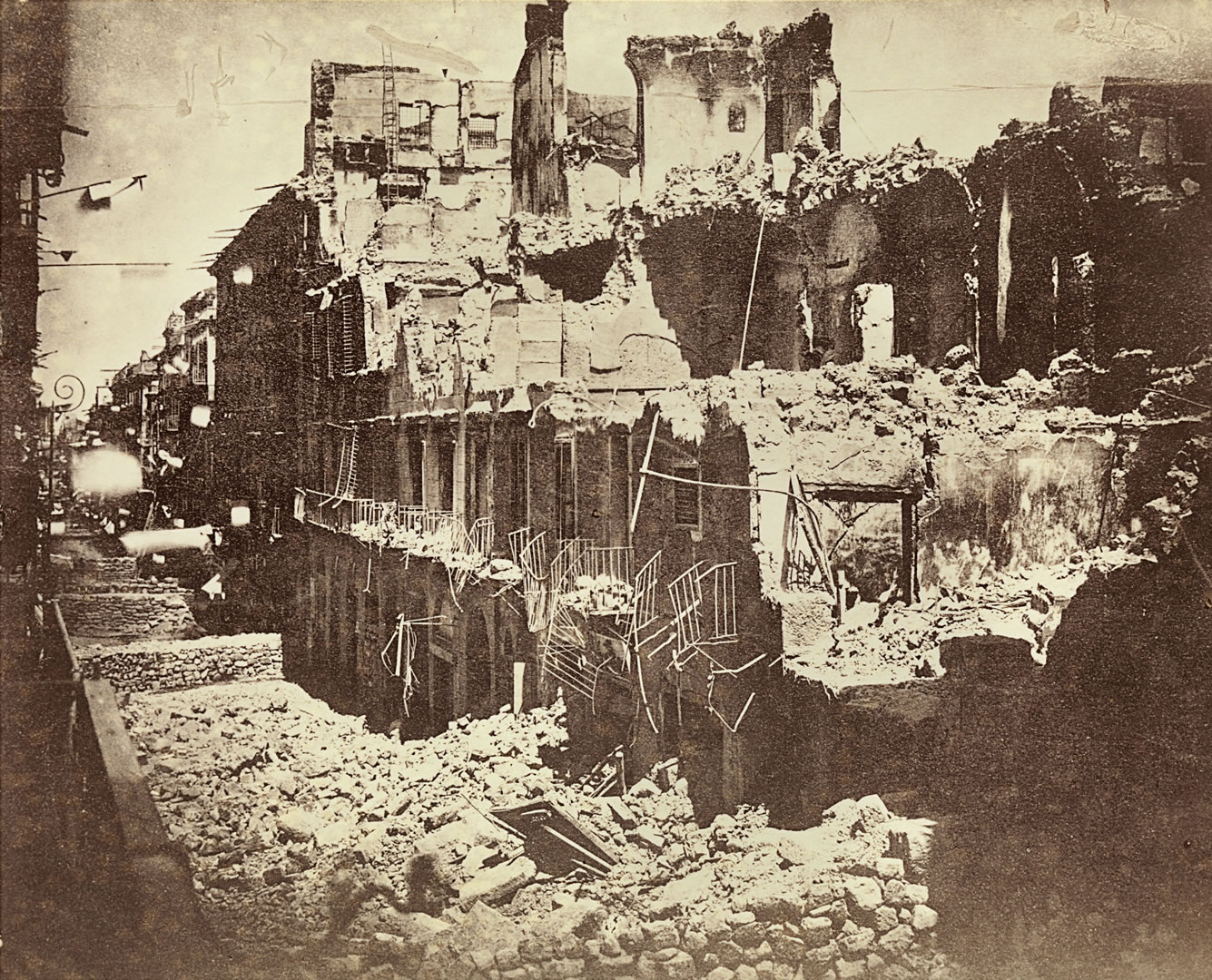
Damaged Dominican monastery on Via Toledo

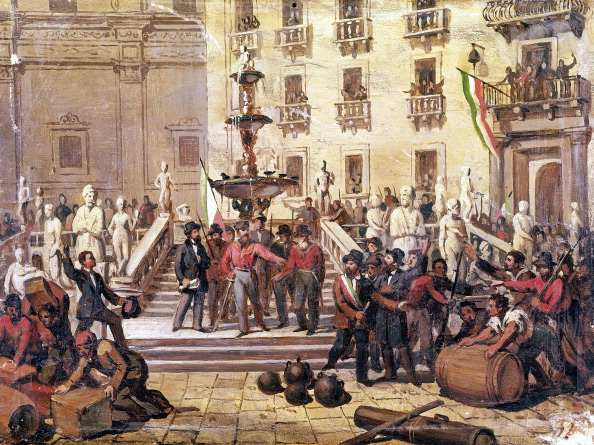
Garibaldi at the Fontana Pretoria after capturing Palermo
