= Croce Taravella =

Italian painter (born 1964)

- Born: 1964 (age 61–62); Polizzi Generosa, Sicily, Italy
- Education: Accademia di Belle Arti di Palermo
- Occupation: Painter

Croce Taravella (born 1964 in Polizzi Generosa) is an Italian painter.

== Biography ==
Croce Taravella was born in 1964 in Polizzi Generosa, in the Metropolitan City of Palermo on the island of Sicily. Taravella studied at the Academy of Fine Arts in Palermo (Accademia di Belle Arti di Palermo). Between 1983 and 1984, curator and art dealer Lucio Amelio, who introduced Taravella to members of the transavanguardia, as well as Andy Warhol, Joseph Beuys, Robert Rauschenberg, Nino Longobardi, and Mimmo Paladino.

In the 1990s he moved to Rome where he worked as a production designer for RAI.

In 2011, he participated in the Italian Pavilion curated by Vittorio Sgarbi at the 54th Venice Biennale.

== Bibliography ==
- Eva Di Stefano, Croce Taravella: Opere 1983-2004, Falcone, Palermo, 2004. 978-8888335100
