= Army of the Danube order of battle =

Army of the Danube
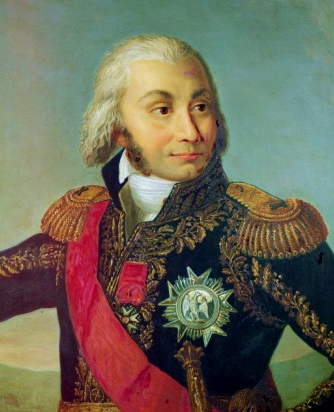
- Jean-Baptiste Jourdan, initial commander-in-chief of the Army of the Danube
- Active: 2 March – 11 December 1799
- Disbanded: 24 November 1799–11 December 1799 units merged into Army of the Rhine; Army remained on paper until 11 December 1799, when its commander was reassigned.
- Country: First Republic
- Type: Field Army
- Role: Invasion of southwestern Germany
- Size: approximately 25,000
- Engagements: Battle of Ostrach (without Vandamme's detached flank); Battle of Stockach (1799); Battle of Winterthur (Most of Advance Guard, plus elements of I. Division and part of Reserves); First Battle of Zürich (Advance Guard and elements of I. Division); Second Battle of Zürich (Advance Guard, elements of I. and III. Divisions and Reserve)

Commanders
- Notable commanders: Jean-Baptiste Jourdan; André Masséna; Louis Marie Turreau

The Army of the Danube was a field army of the French First Republic. Originally named the Army of Observation, it was expanded with elements of the Army of Mainz (Mayence) and the Army of Helvetia (Switzerland). The army had three divisions plus an advance guard, a reserve, and an artillery park. The artillery park was under the command of Jean Ambroise Baston de Lariboisière and consisted of 33 cannons and 19 howitzers operated by 1,329 non-commissioned officers and cannoneers as well as 60 officers. There were approximately 25,000 members of the Army, the role of which was to invade southwestern Germany, precipitating the War of the Second Coalition.

The Army crossed the Rhine River on 1 March 1799 under the command of Jean-Baptiste Jourdan, in the order of battle below. As elements crossed the Rhine, they took the name "Army of the Danube". The crossing was completed by 7 March. After passing through the Black Forest, the Army fought two battles in quick succession, the Battle of Ostrach, on 20–21 March, and Stockach, on 25–26 March. It suffered badly in both engagements and, following the action at Stockach, withdrew to the Black Forest. Jourdan established his headquarters at Hornberg, and the Reserve cavalry and the cavalry of the Advance Guard quartered near Offenburg, where the horses could find better forage.

Initially, the Army included six future Marshals of France: its commander-in-chief, Jourdan; François Joseph Lefebvre; Jean-Baptiste Drouet; Laurent de Gouvion Saint-Cyr; Gabriel Jean Joseph Molitor; and Édouard Adolphe Casimir Joseph Mortier. After the defeat at Ostrach, the Army was reorganized and command shifted to another future marshal, André Masséna. Under Masséna's command, elements of the army participated in skirmishes in Switzerland, the eleven-hour Battle of Winterthur and the First and Second Battles of Zürich. The Army was disbanded in November 1799 and its units dispersed among other French field armies by mid-December.

== Staff ==
Jean-Baptiste Jourdan received command of the Army of Observation in September 1798, from its temporary commander, Pierre Marie Barthélemy Ferino. From October to December, he assessed its condition. By 27 February 1799 Moreau had drawn together his general staff and laid out his operational plan for a Danube campaign.

=== General Staff ===
Chief of Staff Jean Augustin Ernouf
Position	Staff
Commander of the Engineers	Armand Samuel de Marescot
Chief Commissary	Jean Baptiste Vaillant
Commander of the Artillery	Jean Fabre de La Martillière; André Joseph Lemaire
Staff officer	Joseph Augustin Fournier, Marquis d'Aultanne
Adjutants	Gabriel Jean Joseph Molitor; Étienne Hastrel de Rivedoux; Jean-François Barbier; François Louis Dedon-Duclos
Source: Jean-Baptiste Jourdan. A Memoir of the Operations of the Army of the Danube under the Command of General Jourdan, Taken from the Manuscripts of that Officer. London: Debrett, 1799, p. 88.

Inspectors General
Formation	Inspector
Cavalry	Louis-Auguste Juvénal des Ursins d'Harville; François Antoine Louis Bourcier
Infantry	Edmond Louis Alexis Dubois-Crancé
Source: Jean-Baptiste Jourdan. A Memoir of the Operations of the Army of the Danube under the Command of General Jourdan, Taken from the Manuscripts of that Officer. London: Debrett, 1799, p. 88.

== Advance Guard ==
The Advance Guard crossed the Rhine River at Kehl, and marched to the northeast. François Joseph Lefebvre was indisposed—suffering from ringworm—and Jourdan had appointed General of Division Dominique Vandamme to direct the march. Vandamme had been lobbying with Jourdan for a larger and more important command but, given the claims of other officers, this was the best Jourdan could do for him. Vandamme led the Advance Guard through the mountains via Freudenstadt. On 5 March, Lefebvre returned to his command. Within a week, part of the advance guard broke off from the main body and, under command of Vandamme, moved to Stuttgart, to investigate the rumored presence of Habsburg units.

Advance Guard General of Division François Joseph Lefebvre Adjutants: Jean-Baptiste Drouet and François-Xavier Octavie Fontaine. General of Brigade Jean-de-Dieu Soult
Column	Commander	Units	Notes
Left	General of Brigade Édouard Adolphe Casimir Joseph Mortier	25th Regiment of Light Infantry (Légère) (two battalions); 53rd Demi-brigade (two battalions); 67th Demi-brigade (two battalions)	The 53rd and 67th Demi-brigades had formed part of the Army of the Sambre-et-Meuse 1795–1797.
Right	General of Division Dominique Louis Antoine Klein	4th Hussars; 5th Hussars; 1st Light Horse (Chasseurs à Cheval); 17th Dragoons; 3rd Horse Artillery (1st and 27th Company); 1st Foot Artillery (1st and 6th Company); 3rd Battalion Sappers (7th Company)	Most of these units had served in the old Army of the Sambre-et-Meuse.
Detached Flank	General of Division Dominique Vandamme	1st Regiment (Infantry) (two battalions) (Detached from III. Division); 8th Demi-brigade (two battalions) (Detached from Reserve); 1st (or 2nd) Dragoons (one squadron); 8th (or 10th) Light Horse (Chasseurs à Cheval) (one squadron detached from III. Division)	Although Vandamme commanded the I. Division in the absence of Lefebvre, after Lefebvre's return, assumed first, a staff position, and then Jourdan assigned him to investigate rumors of an Austrian presence in Stuttgart. These units became the flanking corps (corps de flanqueurs); one unit was taken from Saint-Cyr's division and the other, 8th of the Line, from d'Hautpoul's reserve. This amounted to approximately 3,000 troops, which weakened both the Reserve and the III. Division. Vandamme's flanking force including a squadron of dragoons and a squadron of light horse, but it is unclear which ones: A squadron of the 1st Dragoons may have been detached from II. Division, or a squadron of the 2nd Dragoons from the left column of the III. Division. In addition, his force included a squadron of Light Horse, from either the 8th or 10th, detached from the III. Division, were engaged.
Strength of Advance Guard: 6,292 infantry; 2,102 cavalry; 382 artillery; and 177 sappers.
Sources: Unless otherwise cited, Roland Kessinger and Geert van Uythoven. Order of Battle, Army of the Danube. Stockach: Roland Kessinger & Geert van Uythoven. Accessed 14 April 2010.

== I. Division ==
The division crossed the Rhine River at Hüningen near Basel, Switzerland, and marched in two columns eastward. The right column, commanded by Jean Victor Tharreau, moved along the northern shoreline of the Rhine. The left column, commanded by Jean-Baptiste Jacopin, moved at the northernmost rim of the river valley. From Switzerland, Masséna sent a Demi-brigade of the Army of Helvetia to secure Schaffhausen, part of the Swiss cantons that lie north of the Rhine river. In holding Schaffhausen, Masséna insured the passage of Ferino's forward units. Ferino's orders were to proceed from Schaffhausen along the north shore of Lake Constance, also called the Bodensee. His left flank was to remain in contact with the II. Division, to prevent the Austrians from piercing the army's forward line. His advance units were to proceed as far as the Imperial Abbey of Salem. From there, he was instructed to prevent any Austrian reinforcements from Switzerland joining with Archduke Charles, whom Jourdan expected to move across the Iller river near Augsburg, and advance into Swabia.

I. Division General of Division Pierre Marie Barthélemy Ferino Adjutants: Jean-Marie Defrance (chief of staff) and Anne Gilbert de Laval
Column	Commander	Units	Notes
Left	General of Brigade Jean-Baptiste Jacopin	102nd Infantry Demi-brigade (two battalions); 6th Light Horse (Chasseurs à Cheval)	Jacopin also commanded the right flank of the Reserve; both columns moved parallel to one another through the Black Forest. Like many of the other units, the elements of this column had been part of the Armée de Sambre-et-Meuse and, in 1798, part of the Army of Germany and the Army of Mainz; the regiment saw action in the Rhineland.
Right	General of Brigade Jean Victor Tharreau	10th Light Infantry Regiment (two battalions); 46th Demi-brigade Light Infantry (two battalions); 11th Dragoons; 6th Horse Artillery (1st and 4th Company); 3rd Foot Artillery (12th and 17th Company); 3rd Battalion Sappers (5th Company)	Tharreau's force provided the forward line protecting Zurich by April 1799; the furthest posts, at Winterthur, were under command of Michel Ney by late May 1799.
Strength of I. Division was 6,452 infantry; 988 cavalry; 481 artillery; and 192 sappers.
Sources: Unless otherwise cited, Roland Kessinger and Geert van Uythoven. Order of Battle, Army of the Danube. Stockach: Roland Kessinger & Geert van Uythoven. Accessed 14 April 2010.

== II. Division ==
The division followed the Advance Guard across the Rhine, also at Kehl. As it approached the mountains, II. Division followed the river valleys east of Freudenstadt. At the Battle of Ostrach, II. Division took position behind François Joseph Lefebvre's Advance Guard, on the slope below Pfullendorf. At the Battle of Stockach, Souham's Division, positioned in the center, was to coordinate a simultaneous assault with Ferino's I. Division on the Austrian left flank.

II. Division General of Division Joseph Souham Adjutants: Pierre-Charles Lochet and Henri Gatien Bertrand
Column	Commander	Units	Notes
Left	General of Brigade François Goullus	83rd Demi-brigade (two battalions); 6th Dragoons; 7th Horse Artillery (4th company)	The 1st Dragoons fought at Battle of Frauenfeld, First Battle of Zurich, and at the action at Battle of Schwyz in the summer 1799. Their Chef de Brigade Jean-Baptiste-Theodore Vialanes was wounded in southwestern Germany in 1800; he eventually was promoted to brigadier general in 1803 and raised to baron of the Empire in 1808. Jacques LeBaron was Chef de Brigade of the 6th Dragoons; he was killed on 6 February 1807 at the Battle of Eylau.
Right	General of Brigade Charles Mathieu Isidore Decaen	2nd Demi-brigade (two battalions); 7th Demi-brigade (two battalions); 1st Dragoons (two squadrons); 7th Horse Artillery (3rd Company); 2nd Foot Artillery (15th Company); 7th Foot Artillery (13th Company); 3rd Battalion Sappers (1st Company)	Francois-Alexis Guyonneau de Pambour (1766–1802) was appointed Chef-de-Brigade of the 7th Horse Artillery on 26 March 1799; the previous Chef Nicolas-Louis Gueriot de Saint-Martin had been promoted to brigadier general in February of that year. The regiment was disbanded in 1801. The 2nd Foot Artillery took battle honors at the Second Battle of Zürich in September 1799.
Strength: 5,630 infantry; 847 cavalry; 316 artillery; and 161 sappers.
Sources: Unless otherwise cited, Roland Kessinger and Geert van Uythoven. Order of Battle, Army of the Danube. Stockach: Roland Kessinger & Geert van Uythoven. Accessed 14 April 2010.

== III. Division ==
The Third Division and the Reserve also crossed at Kehl, and then divided into two columns, III. Division traveling through the Black Forest via Oberkirch, and the Reserve, with most of the artillery park, via the valleys at Freiburg im Breisgau, where the horses would find more forage, and then over the mountains past the Titisee to Löffingen and Hüfingen. At the Battle of Ostrach, after more than 15 hours of general engagement, the Austrians flanked the III. Division's left wing and pressed the entire division back to the Pfullendorf heights. At the Battle of Stockach, Saint-Cyr and Vandamme were to execute simultaneous attacks on the Austrian right flank, Saint-Cyr on the front and Vandamme from the rear; the attacks failed when Archduke Charles moved support troops from the left flank.

III. Division General of Division Laurent de Gouvion Saint-Cyr
Column	Commander	Units	Notes
Left	General of Brigade Frédéric Henri Walther; Adjutant-General Jean Louis Debilly	180th Demi-brigade (two battalions); 2nd Dragoons (four squadrons)	Walther's dragoons covered Michel Ney's withdrawal at the Clash at Winterthur. A squadron of the 2nd Dragoons may have been detached to Vandamme's flanking corps.
Right	General of Brigade Claude Juste Alexandre Legrand; Adjutant-General Charles Saligny de San-Germano	1st Demi-brigade (two battalions); 50th Demi-brigade (two battalions); 8th Light Horse (Chasseurs à Cheval); 10th Light Horse (Chasseurs à Cheval); 3rd Horse Artillery (5th and 20th Company); 3rd Foot Artillery (4th and 6th Company); 3rd Battalion Sappers (3rd Company)	The 10th was commanded by Michel Ordener. Ordener was wounded on 14 August 1799. The 10th participated in the Battles at Ostrach and Stockach. Two squadrons from the 8th or the 10th Light Horse were detached to support Vandamme's flanking move to Stuttgart.
Strength: 4,844 Infantry; 1,353 cavalry; 301 artillery; 193 sappers
Sources: Unless otherwise cited, Roland Kessinger and Geert van Uythoven. Order of Battle, Army of the Danube. Stockach: Roland Kessinger & Geert van Uythoven. Accessed 14 April 2010.

== Reserve ==
The Reserve crossed the river at Kehl, swung south toward Freiburg im Breisgau, and crossed the mountains at Neustadt, to Loffingen, Bruhlingen and Hüfingen. At the Battle of Ostrach, the Reserve remained in the northern outskirts of Pfullendorf and did not participate in the battle except in small groups. When Jourdan decided to withdraw, d'Hautpoul's cavalry moved to the west first, to secure bridges and the east–west roads. At the battle of Stockach, the Reserve was slow to support of Ferino's I. Division, which had run out of ammunition; when a cavalry charged failed to materialize, the Austrians acquired the upper hand. Jourdan later charged d'Hautpoul with dereliction. After the Stockach engagement, most of the Reserve withdrew to the west side of the Black Forest, where the horses could find forage, but by late April, the Reserve had joined with the André Masséna's Army of Helvetia outside of Zürich; d'Hautpoul joined them in July after he was cleared by a Courts-martial in Strasbourg.

Reserve General of Division Jean-Joseph Ange d'Hautpoul
Commander(s)	Units	Notes
Louis Fursy Henri Compere; Christophe Ossvald François Léon Ormancey; Jean Christophe Collin	1st Mounted Carabiniers Regiment; 2nd Mounted Carabiniers Regiment; 4th Cavalry Regiment; 6th Cavalry Regiment; 7th Cavalry Regiment; 8th Cavalry Regiment; 23rd Cavalry Regiment; 25th Cavalry Regiment; 6th Horse Artillery (5th Company); 7th Horse Artillery (2nd Company); 3rd Foot Artillery (2nd and 3rd Company); 3rd Battalion Sappers	Antoine Christophe was chef-de-brigade (colonel) of the 1st Regiment; Armand-Augustine-Louis De Caulaincourt was appointed chef-de-brigade of the 2nd Regiment on 30 July 1799; he was wounded on 2 November 1799. Both men were eventually promoted to brigadier general.
Strength of Reserve – 2,897 infantry; 2,567 cavalry; 333 artillery; and 365 sappers.
Sources: Unless otherwise cited, Roland Kessinger and Geert van Uythoven. Order of Battle, Army of the Danube. Stockach: Roland Kessinger & Geert van Uythoven. Accessed 14 April 2010.

== Artillery park ==
Command: Jean Ambroise Baston de Lariboisière

- Cannons: 33 four-pounders; 21 eight-pounders; and seven 12-pounders
- Howitzers: 19
- Personnel (effective strength): 1,329 non-commissioned officers and cannoneers; 60 officers; Total 1,389

== Sources ==
=== Bibliography ===
- Alison, Sir Archibald. A History of Europe from the Commencement of the French Revolution in 1789 to the Restoration of the Bourbons, New York: A.S. Barnes, 1850. OCLC 85023438.
- Blanning, Timothy. The French Revolutionary Wars. New York: Oxford University Press, 1996, ISBN 0-340-56911-5.
- Broughton, Tony. Regimental Histories of the Carabiniers. (July 2000). French Foot Artillery., 1st Dragoons., 6th Dragoons, and 7th Horse Artillery. (August 2000). Commanders of the 10th Regiment of Chasseurs-a-Cheval (November 2000). Military Subjects: Organization, Tactics and Strategy. Napoleon Series. Robert Burnham, Editor in chief. Accessed 8 May 2010.
- Broughton, Tony. "Generals Who Served in the French Army during the Period 1789–1814: Vabre to Voulland". Napoleon Series.org. Robert Burnham, Editor in chief. November 2007. Accessed 24 April 2010.
- Dodge, Theodore Ayrault. Napoleon: A History of the Art of War. volume 3, Boston: Houghton Mifflin Co, 1904.
- Gallagher, John, Napoleon's enfant terrible: General Dominique Vandamme, Tulsa, University of Oklahoma Press, 2008, ISBN 978-0-8061-3875-6.
- Haythornthwaite, Philip J. Napoleon's commanders. London: Osprey Military, 2001–2002. ISBN 1-84176-055-2.
- Hug, Lina and Richard Stead. Switzerland. The Nineteenth Century: General Collection; N.1.1.4543 (microfilmed). New York: G.P. Putnam's Sons, 1902. OCLC 81231346
- Jourdan, Jean-Baptiste. A Memoir of the Operations of the Army of the Danube under the Command of General Jourdan, taken from the manuscripts of that officer. Translation of: Précis des opérations de l'armée du Danube, sous les ordres du Général Jourdan. William Combe (trans.). London: Debrett, 1799. OCLC 476374921.
- Kessinger, Roland and Gert Vanuythoven. Order of Battle, Army of the Danube. Stockach: Roland Kessinger & Geert van Uythoven. Accessed 14 April 2010.
- (in German) Kessinger, Roland. '"Die Schlacht von Stockach am 25. März 1799". Zeitschrift für Militärgeschichte. Salzburg: Öst. Milizverlag, 1997–. [2006].
- Phipps, Ramsay Weston and Elizabeth Sandars (editor). Armies of the French Republic, Westport CT: Greenwood Press, 1939, volume 5. OCLC 459345883
- Shadwell, Lawrence. Mountain Warfare Illustrated by the Campaign of 1799 in Switzerland (being a translation of the Swiss narrative, compiled from the works of the Archduke Charles, Jomini, and others...) London: Henry S. King, 1875. OCLC 80424891
- Smith, Digby. Napoleonic Wars Databook: Actions and Losses in Personnel, Colours, Standards and Artillery, 1792–1815. Mechanicsburg PA: Stackpole, 1998, ISBN 1-85367-276-9.
- Smith, Digby. Napoleon's Regiments: Battle Histories of the Regiments of the French Armies, 1792–1815. London: Greenhill, 2000. ISBN 1-85367-413-3
- Thiers, Adolphe. The History of the French Revolution. Frederick Shobert (trans.) New York: Appleton, 1854, v. 4. OCLC 2530647
