= Battle of Stockach (1799) order of battle =

On 25 March 1799, French and Habsburg armies fought for control of the geographically strategic Hegau in present-day Baden-Württemberg. The battle has been called by various names: First Battle of Stockach, the Battle by Stockach, and, in French chronicles, the Battle of Liptingen (or Leibtengen). In the broader military context, this battle comprises a keystone in the first campaign in southwestern Germany during the Wars of the Second Coalition, part of the French Revolutionary Wars. For an explanation of the types of forces, please see Types of military forces in the Napoleonic Wars.

== Background ==
Stockach lies at the junction of east–west and north–south roads on the eastern side of the Black Forest. Strategically, control of the location offered access between the Swiss and Italian theaters and those in southern, central and northern Germany. French control would protect access to the Black forest and the Rhine, of strategic importance in the Directory's plans to force the Habsburg army back to Vienna.

The day-long battle at Stockach and Engen pitted the two armies against each other for the second time in seven days. The Austrians still had the numerical superiority, but this time it was closer to two-to-one, instead of almost three-to-one. Jourdan had consolidated his force over a shorter line, and had the full Army of the Danube under his direct command. Charles, likewise, had shortened his line; although Hotze had not yet caught up with the archduke, he and his 10,000 men were approaching from the Austrians' left rear.

== Army of the Danube ==
General of Division Jean-Baptiste Jourdan commanding.

Chief of Staff: General of Division Jean Augustin Ernouf
Engineering: General of Division Armand Samuel de Marescot
Artillery: General of Division Jean Fabre de la Martillière

=== Advanced Guard ===
General of Division François Joseph Lefebvre
Adj. General Jean-Baptiste Drouet
Adj. General François-Xavier Octavie Fontaine

- Generals of Brigade Jean-de-Dieu Soult, Adolphe Édouard Casimir Joseph Mortier, Anne Gilbert de Laval

- 25th Demi-brigade Light Infantry (3 battalions)
- 53rd Demi Brigade Line Infantry (3 battalions)
- 67th Demi Brigade Line Infantry (3 battalions)

- General of Brigade Dominique Louis Antoine Klein

- 17th Dragoon Regiment
- 1st Chasseurs à Cheval
- 4th Hussars (4 squadrons)
- 5th Hussars (4 squadrons)
- 2 Foot Artillery Batteries
- 1 Horse Artillery Battery
- 3rd Battalion Sappers (7th Company)

=== First Division ===
General of Division Pierre Marie Barthélemy Ferino

Pierre Garnier de Laboissière

- Left Brigade: Jean-Baptiste Jacopin

- 102nd Demi Brigade Line Infantry (3 battalions)
- 6th Chasseurs à Cheval (4 squadrons)

- Right Brigade: Jean Victor Tharreau

- 10th Demi Brigade Light Infantry (3 battalions)
- 46th Demi Brigade Line Infantry(3 battalions)
- 11th Dragoon Regiment (4 squadrons)
- 3 Foot Artillery Batteries
- 1 Horse Artillery Battery
- 3rd Battalion Sappers

=== Second Division ===
General of Division Joseph Souham

- Left Brigade General of Brigade François Goullus

- 83rd Demi Brigade, Line Infantry (3 battalions)
- 7th Demi Brigade, Line Infantry (2 battalions)
- 6th Dragoons (4 squadrons)

- Right Brigade General of Brigade Charles Mathieu Isidore Decaen

- 2nd Demi Brigade, Light Infantry (3 battalions)
- 1st Dragoons (4 squadrons)
- 2nd Foot Artillery (15th Company)
- 7th Horse Artillery Unit (13th Company)

=== Third Division ===
General of Division Laurent de Gouvion Saint-Cyr

- General of Brigade Frédéric Henri Walther

- 108th Demi Brigade, Line Infantry (3 battalions)
- 2nd Dragoon Regiment

- General of Brigade Claude Juste Alexandre Legrand

- 11th Demi Brigade, Light Infantry (2 battalions)
- 1st Demi Brigade, Line Infantry (2 battalions)
- 8th Chasseurs à Cheval (4 squadrons)
- 10th Chasseurs à Cheval (4 squadrons)
- 2 Foot Artillery Units
- 1 Horse Artillery Units

=== Cavalry Reserves ===
General of Division Jean-Joseph Ange d'Hautpoul
- 1st Carabiniers Regiment
- 2nd Carabiniers Regiment
- 4th Cavalry Regiment
- 6th Cavalry Regiment
- 7th Cavalry Regiment
- 8th Cavalry Regiment
- 23rd Cavalry Regiment
- 25th Cavalry Regiment
- 6th Horse Artillery (5th company)
- 7th Horse Artillery (2nd company)
- 3rd Foot Artillery (2nd and 3rd company)
- 3rd Battalion Sappers

=== Detached Flank Corps ===
General of Division Dominique Vandamme
- 1st Light Infantry (2 battalions)
- 8th Demi Brigade, light infantry (3 battalions)
- 50th Demi Brigade, light infantry (3 battalions each)
- 1 Squadron Dragoons
- 1 Foot Artillery Unit
- 8th or 10th Chasseurs a Cheval (1 squadron)

== Habsburg Army ==
Field Marshal Archduke Charles Commander in Chief

=== Advanced Guard ===
- Lt. Field Marshal Friedrich Joseph, Count of Nauendorf

Major General Maximilian, Count of Merveldt

- Major General Merveldt

- Freikorps (independent corps) Wurmser (12 companies)
- 1st Hussars Kaiser (8 squadrons)
- 1st Lancers Merveldt (8 squadrons)
- 13th Border Infantry Regiment Wallachian Illyrian (1st Battalion)

- Major General Joseph Kempf (commanded a portion of Petrasch's division, included in the advanced guard)

- 1st Infantry Regiment Kaiser (3 battalions)
- 31st Infantry Regiment Benjowsky (2 battalions)

=== Right Wing ===
Feldzeugmeister Olivier, Count of Wallis

- Lt. Field Marshal Karl Aloys zu Fürstenberg

- Colonel Joseph Ulm

- 35th Infantry Regiment Wenkheim (3 battalions)

- Major General Ludwig von Vogelsang

- 21st Infantry Regiment Gemmingen (3 battalions)
- 42nd Infantry Regiment Erbach (2 battalions)

- Lt. Field Marshal Franz, Baron von Petrasch

- Major General Kempf

- Two regiments detached to advance guard
- 49th Infantry Regiment Kerpen (2 battalions)

- Lt. Field Marshal Augustus Christian Frederick, Duke of Anhalt-Köthen

- Major General Andreas O'Reilly von Ballinlough

- 6th Light Dragoons Coburg (6 squadrons)

- Major General Franz Roë (or Anton?)

- 2nd Light Dragoons, Archduke Ferdinand (6 squadrons)

- Lt. Field Marshal Johann Sigismund Riesch

- Major General Frederick Louis, Prince of Hohenlohe-Ingelfingen

- 9th Cuirassier Regiment Nassau-Usingen (6 squadrons)
- 10th Cuirassier Regiment Mack (6 squadrons)

=== Center ===
==== Reinforced Forward Line ====
Lt. Field Marshal Nauendorf

- 12th Infantry Regiment Manfredini (3 battalions)

- Major General Ignaz Gyulai

- 6th Border Infantry Regiment Warasdin St. George (1st Battalion)
- 8th Border Infantry Regiment Gradiska (3rd Battalion)
- 16th Border Infantry Regiment Siebenburg-Wallachian (1st Battalion)

- Major General Michael von Kienmayer

- 3rd Hussars Erzherzog Karl d'Este (8 squadrons)
- 10th Hussars Meszaros (8 squadrons)

- Major General Christoph Karl von Piacsek

- Tirolean Jägers (3 companies)
- 5th Light Battalion Radivojevich (6 companies)
- 12th Border Hussars Croatian Slavic (6 squadrons)

- Lt. Field Marshal Siegfried von Kospoth (of the Reserve)

- Major General Joseph Spiegelberg

- 12th Light Dragoons Kinsky (6 squadrons)

- Major General Friedrich Joseph Ludwig of Hessen-Homburg

- 11th Light Dragoons Latour (6 squadrons)

- Major General Franz Ludwig Sebottendorf

- 2nd Infantry Regiment Archduke Ferdinand (3 battalions)

==== Reserve ====
- Lt. Field Marshal Vinzenz Kolowrat-Liebsteinsky

- Grenadier Battalion Tegethoff (20th, 22nd, and 29th)
- Grenadier Battalion Bojaowsky (1st 7th and 12th)
- Grenadier Battalion Teschner (3rd, 35th and 50th)
- Grenadier Battalion Lippe (2nd, 31st and 60th)
- Grenadier Battalion Sebottendorf (41st, 49th and 56th)
- Grenadier Battalion Juch (21st, 42, and 54th)

=== Left Wing ===
Lt. Field Marshal Joseph Staader

==== Advanced Guard ====
- Major General Karl Philipp Fürst zu Schwarzenberg

- Border Sharpshooters (4 companies)
- 12th Light battalion Rubinitz (6 companies)
- 2nd Lancers (6 squadrons)
- 4th Hussar Regiment Vecsey (6 squadrons)

==== Main Force (Left) ====
- Lt. Field Marshal Ludwig Anton, Count Baillet de Latour

- Major General Anton Ulrich Mylius

- 12th Border Infantry Regiment Banat (1st Battalion)
- 22nd Infantry Regiment Lacy (3 battalions)
- 7th Infantry Regiment Carl Schroeder (3 battalions)

- Lt. Field Marshal Prince Heinrich XV of Reuss-Plauen

- Major General Karl Friedrich von Lindenau

- 3rd Infantry Regiment Erzherzog Karl (3 battalions)
- 29th Infantry Regiment Oliver Wallis (3 battalions)

- Lt. Field Marshal Nikolaus Colloredo-Mels

- Major General Prince Franz Seraph of Rosenberg-Orsini

- 7th Cuirassiers Lothringen (6 squadrons)
- 8th Cuirassiers Hohenzollern (6 squadrons)

- Lt. Field Marshal Alexander of Württemberg

- Major General Johann Jacob Klinglin

- 2nd Cuirassiers Archduke Franz d'Este (6 squadrons)
- 11th Cuirassiers Ansbach (4 squadrons)

=== Detached (flanking) force ===
Lt. Colonel Wiedersberg
- Tirolean Jägers (1 company)
- 1st Border Hussars Croatian Slavic (4 squadrons)
- 7th Light Dragoons Waldeck (2 squadrons)

== Sources ==
Bibliography

Source for Orders of Battle:

- (in German) Kessinger, Roland. '"Die Schlacht von Stockach am 25. Maerz 1799". Zeitschrift für Militärgeschichte. Salzburg: Öst. Milizverlag, 1997-. [2006].
- Smith, Digby (1998). The Greenhill Napoleonic Wars Data Book: Actions and Losses in Personnel, Colours, Standards and Artillery, 1792–1815. Mechanicsburg, Pennsylvania: Stackpole Books. ISBN 1-85367-276-9.

Other information:

- Alison, Sir Archibald. A History of Europe from the Commencement of the French Revolution in 1789 to the Restoration of the Bourbons. New York: A.S. Barnes, 1850.
- Blanning, Timothy, The French Revolutionary Wars, New York: Oxford University Press, 1996. ISBN 0-340-56911-5
- Bruce, Robert R. Fighting techniques of the Napoleonic Age, 1792–1815. London: Thomas Dunne (St. Martin's Press), 2008, 978–0312375874
- Deans, William. A History of France from earliest times to the present. V. 2, London: Thomas Jack, 1882.
- Dodge, Theodore Ayrault. Napoleon: A History of the Art of War. Volume 3, Boston: Houghton Mifflin Co, 1904.
- (in German) Jens-Florian Ebert. "Feldmarschall-Leutnant Fürst zu Fürstenberg," Die Österreichischen Generäle 1792-1815. Accessed 7 October 2009.
- Gallagher, John, Napoleon's enfant terrible: General Dominique Vandamme. Tulsa, University of Oklahoma Press, 2008, ISBN 978-0-8061-3875-6.
- Jourdan, Jean-Baptiste (1799). A Memoir of the operations of the army of the Danube under the command of General Jourdan, taken from the manuscripts of that officer. London: Debrett's.
- Phipps, Ramsey Weston. The Armies of the First French Republic. volume 5: "The armies of the Rhine in Switzerland, Holland, Italy, Egypt and the coup d'etat of Brumaire, 1797–1799." Oxford: Oxford University Press, 1939.
- Rothenberg, Gunther E. (2007). Napoleon's great adversaries: Archduke Charles and the Austrian Army 1792–1914. Stroud, Gloucestershire: Spellmount. ISBN 978-1-86227-383-2.
- Seaton, Albert. The Austro-Hungarian army of the Napoleonic wars. London: Osprey, 1973, 9780850451474.
- Smith, Digby. The Greenhill Napoleonic Wars Data Book: Actions and Losses in Personnel, Colours, Standards and Artillery, 1792–1815, Greenhill, PA, Stackpole, 1998, ISBN 1-85367-276-9
- Biographies of Austrian generals by Smith, Digby and Kudrna, Leopold
- Thiers, Adolphe. The history of the French revolution, New York, Appleton, 1854, v. 4,
- Young, John, D.D. A History of the Commencement, Progress, and Termination of the Late War between Great Britain and France which continued from the first day of February 1793 to the first of October 1801. In two volumes. Edinburg: Turnbull, 1802, vol. 2.
