= Louis Klein =

French general (1761–1845)

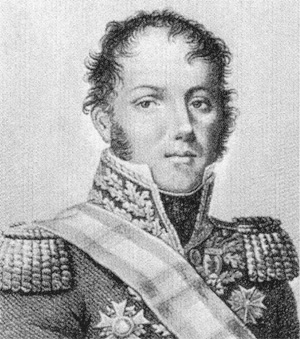
- Born: 29 January 1761; Blâmont Meurthe-et-Moselle
- Died: 2 November 1845 (aged 84) Paris
- Branch: Cavalry
- Service years: 1777–1787; 1790–1814
- Rank: General of Division
- Conflicts: French Revolutionary Wars; Napoleonic Wars
- Awards: Officer's Grand Cross, Légion d'honneur Count of the Empire, 1808; Grand Cordon, Order of the Lion of Bavaria; Order of Saint Louis; Peer of France, 1831.
- Other work: Senator.

Dominique Louis Antoine Klein (French pronunciation: [dɔminik lwi ɑ̃twan klajn]; 19 January 1761 – 2 November 1845) served in the French military during the French Revolutionary Wars and the Napoleonic Wars as a general of cavalry.

Initially part of the house guard at the royal residences for Louis XVI, Klein left the military in 1787. During the French Revolution, he enlisted and rose rapidly from a lieutenant to a brigadier general; he participated in the French invasion of southwestern Germany in 1796, and was part of the Army of the Danube in 1799. His cavalry played critical roles in the battles of Austerlitz and Jena and Auerstadt. Following the Prussian campaign, he retired from active service, entered politics, and performed administrative duties in Paris.

Klein served in the French Senate, and voted for Napoleon Bonaparte's abdication in 1814; he did not participate in the Hundred Days, and Louis XVIII raised him to the French peerage upon the second restoration.

== Military career ==
Initially, Klein served in the royal house guard for the King of France, holding the prestigious position as guard of the gate. He left military service in 1787. After the French Revolution began in 1789, he rejoined the military and in 1792, he was listed as an infantry lieutenant in the Army of the North. His cavalry regiment participated in the Battle of Fleurus.

=== French Revolutionary Wars ===
By 1795, Klein was a brigadier general in the Army of Sambre-et-Meuse, where he replaced Adjutant-General Michel Ney. Klein was appointed general of division in 1799 and crossed the Rhine at Kehl in Jean-Baptiste Jourdan's Army of the Danube. He commanded the right flank of the Advance Guard, under command of François Joseph Lefebvre. His command included the 4th and 5th Hussar Regiments, the 17th Dragoons, the 1st Chasseurs à cheval, a light horse regiment, two companies of horse artillery, two of foot artillery, and a company of sappers. At the Battle of Ostrach, Klein's cavalry helped to secure the village of Hosskirch, a strategically important forward post, prior to the general engagement. After the French losses at Ostrach and the subsequent Battle of Stockach, Jourdan ordered a general withdrawal to the Black Forest. The reserve cavalry and most of Klein's division crossed the mountains and quartered near Offenburg, where their horses could find better forage. Despite the organized withdrawal and the relatively secure positions on the western side of the Black Forest, the army was in shambles. Jourdan placed his chief of staff Jean Augustin Ernouf in provisional command and went to Paris to complain about the state of his army, its equipment and its provisions. Discipline in the ranks disintegrated. Most of the divisional generals left their posts, except for Pierre Marie Barthélemy Ferino, Joseph Souham, Dominique Vandamme and Klein. In May, Andre Massena received overall command of both the Army of the Danube and the Army of Helvetia; Klein's column joined Massena near Zurich.

In May 1799, Klein led a cavalry division of 2,010 prior to the Battle of Winterthur. A few days later, he commanded the cavalry reserve against the Archduke Charles and the Austrian army at the First Battle of Zurich. Charles' superior numbers and position forced the French to retreat from Zurich, taking up position on the western side of the Limmat River. In September, he again commanded the cavalry reserve, the VII. Division, of 3,696 on the left (west) bank of the Aar river. He was responsible for guarding the Frick valley (Fricktal). There, as the dispositions developed for the Second Battle of Zurich on 25 September, Klein remained under direct command of Massena. Klein prepared to support either the troops of Jean Thomas Guillaume Lorge or Édouard Adolphe Casimir Joseph Mortier, on the north or south flanks respectively, as required. The Austrian assault fell hardest on Mortier, who was driven back from the strategically placed Dietikon. Klein's reserve enabled the French to retake and hold the village. This convinced the Russian commander in Zurich, Alexander Korsakov, that he should draw his troops back to the city fortifications. Later, as Korsakoff relinquished these, the Russians executed a confused withdrawal to Constance. In the chaos, Honoré Théodore Maxime Gazan's division, supported by Klein's reserve, pressed the Coalition forces hard at the west end of Constance, by the bridge to the abbey at Petershausen. They nearly captured the Prince Condé and the Duke d'Enghien themselves. Although the French took many prisoners, including many of the Army of Condé, the French emigrant army, these prisoners were not massacred whole-sale, as had happened after earlier battles. Klein and Mortier issued instructions, which were supported by Massena, that the émigrés be assigned Russian names—they were, after all, under Russian pay and wearing the Russian cockade in their caps—and treated with dignity; they were eventually exchanged for French officers held prisoner by the Austrians and Russians.

Returning to France after the Peace of Lunéville in 1801, Klein remained inactive for several months. In 1802 he was recalled to military service as Inspector of Cavalry. He was given command of the 1st Division of Dragoons and in 1804 was made a Grand Officer of the Legion d'honneur.

=== Napoleonic Wars ===
In 1805, Klein's division was part of the newly created VIII. Corps, under command of Édouard Mortier; the role of the Corps was to patrol and secure the northern shore of the Danube river, limiting the Austro-Russian activity. Napoleon incorrectly assumed that the Russians and the Austrians would make a stand near St. Pölten, northwest of Vienna. Klein's entire regiment of dragoons patrolled the northern Danube shore, while the rest of his division, the last in the extended line of march, was more than a day behind Maxime Gazan's lead division. Klein's division did not take part in the Battle of Dürenstein, although his dragoons were with Mortier and Gazan immediately prior to the engagement.

Klein's division was part of the decisive defeat of the Austrian and Russian force at the subsequent Battle of Austerlitz three weeks later. Initially, his dragoons, assigned to support Friant's division, occupied a position of observation on the Marchfeld. The rest of his dragoons remained near Stockerau, just to the west of Vienna, and these dragoons, plus Louis-Nicolas Davout's, François Antoine Louis Bourcier's and Marc Antoine Beaumont's divisions of dragoons, formed a cordon between Pohrlitz and Pressburg, and could move either west or east, depending on the actions of the Archduke Charles or the Russian commander Kutuzov. Consequently, Klein's dragoons, held the road between Austerlitz and Vienna, eliminating a possible Austrian retreat.

Promotions & Awards

- 1777–1787, Guard of the Gate.
- 1792, First Lieutenant, 83rd Regiment, later 11th Chasseurs
- 1794, General of Brigade, Army of Sambre-et-Meuse
- 1799, General of Division, Army of the Danube
- 1802, Inspector General of Cavalry
- 1804, Legion of Honor
- 1805, Envoy, Grand Armeé
- 1807, Senator
- 1808, Governor of the Imperial Palace
- 1808-1809, Count of the Empire, Grand Cordon of the Order of the Bavarian Lion
- 1812, National Guard, Paris
- 1814-15, Peer of France, Order of St. Louis
- 1834, Grand Cross, Legion of Honor

In the War of the Fourth Coalition, Klein fought in the Grande Armée under command of Joachim Murat. After the Battle of Jena-Auerstadt, Klein was with his division of dragoons in the village of Weissensee, the only escape route open to the Prussian General Blücher. Blücher was surprised to find Klein in possession of the village, but convinced him an armistice has been concluded between Prussia and Napoleon. Reports differ on the conduct of Klein and Blücher. William Milligan Sloane insists that Frederick William III of Prussia was with Blücher and that only the old general's bluff prevented the King's capture. Some historians assert that Klein believed him, and learned too late that he had been deceived. Others assert that Klein's force was too weak to resist the greater Prussian numbers. He had only 800 cavalry and Antoine Lasalle, to the west, had two regiments. Blücher had either 7,000, according to Charles Mullié, or more than 12,000 Prussian infantry, artillery and horse. Regardless, Klein and Lasalle either pragmatically maintained the fiction or fell for the ruse; Blücher and his Prussians passed through the village. Charles Mullié maintains that Klein vowed revenge; with his division, he pursued and attacked Blücher force the following day. He took 10 Prussian standards and 1,000 prisoners, including a general officer, although he did not capture Blücher. Frances Lorraine Petrie gives that credit to Soult, and so does Adolphe Thiers; furthermore, Petre maintains, Klein's dragoons were sent to guard the communications lines between Erfurt and Weimar, where several groups of Prussians had skirmished with the French rear guard.

=== Administrative and political duties ===
Following the Prussian campaign, Napoleon appointed Klein as governor of the Imperial palace. In 1807, Klein was called to the Senate. In 1808, he was raised by letters of patent to a count of the empire and awarded the Grand Cordon of the Order of the Bavarian Lion. In 1812, he was placed in command of the recruitment and training of a cohort of the National Guard.

He remained in the Senate until April 1814, when he voted for Napoleon's abdication. In 1814, during the Bourbon Restoration, he was named a knight of the Order of Saint Louis. He did not support Napoleon's return in the Hundred Days. In the Second Restoration, Louis XVIII raised him to the French peerage.

== Family and personal life ==
Louis Klein was born on 25 January 1761 in Blâmont (Meurthe), in the Lorraine region. He married 7 January 1783 to Marie-Agathe Pierron, with whom he had a son Edouard Marie Arsène (1784 – 1843). Edouard had two daughters, Arsène Louise Marie, born 1820, married Mathieu Prosper Morey; and Louise Françoise Clémence, born in Hebreville, 1825, married in Paris to Henri Tollier.

In 1808, Klein divorced Pierron, with the Emperor's permission, and on 2 July of that year remarried to Caroline of Valangin-Arberg, daughter of the Countess of Arberg, a lady-in-waiting to the Empress Josephine de Beauharnais. In this marriage, he had a son, Eugene Joseph Napoleon, who was born in 1813 in Paris and died in 1872 . Louis Klein died 2 November 1845 in Paris.

== Sources ==
=== Bibliography ===
- (in French) de Genouillac, Henri Gourdon . Dictionnaire des anoblis, 1270-1868, suivi du Dictionnaire des familles. Paris, Bachelin-Deflorenne, 1875.
- Goetz, Robert. 1805: Austerlitz. Mechanicsburg, Pennsylvania: Stackpole Books, 2005. ISBN 1-85367-644-6,.
- Jourdan, Jean-Baptiste, A Memoir of the operations of the army of the Danube under the command of General Jourdan, taken from the manuscripts of that officer. London: Debrett, 1799.
- Kessinger, Roland. Order of Battle, Army of the Danube. Stockach: Roland Kessinger & Geert van Uythoven. Accessed 14 April 2010.
- Milligan, Sloane William. The Life Of Napoleon Bonaparte. New York: Century, 1911, OCLC 10388397, Volume II.
- Mullié, Charles (1852). "Klein (Dominique Louis Antoine, comte)" . Biographie des célébrités militaires des armées de terre et de mer de 1789 à 1850 (in French). Paris: Poignavant et Compagnie.
- Petre, Francis Loraine. Napoleon's Conquest of Prussia. London, John Lane; New York, John Lane Co., 1907, OCLC 1817897.
- Phipps, Ramsay Weston. The Armies of the First French Republic. Volume 5: "The armies of the Rhine in Switzerland, Holland, Italy, Egypt and the coup d'état of Brumaire, 1797–1799", Oxford: Oxford University Press, 1939.
- (in French) Révérend, Albert (vicomte). Titres, anoblissements et pairies de la restauration 1814–1830. Paris, Chez l'auteur et chez H. Champion, 1901—06, volume 4.
- (in French) Soulié, Eudoxe; Musée national de Versailles et des Trianons. Notice des peintures et sculptures composant le Musée Impérial. Versailles: Montalant-Bougleux, 1854–1855, v. 1.
- Smith, Digby. Napoleonic Wars Databook. London: Greenhill Publishing Co., 1998, ISBN 1-85367-276-9.
- Thiers, Adolphe. History of the consulate and the empire of France under Napoleon. D. Forbes Campbell and John Stebbing (trans.). London: Chatto & Windus; Philadelphia: J.B. Lippincott, 1893–1894, OCLC 12606477, vol. 4
- (in French) LEONORE Data Base
