= Jean Vaillant (disambiguation) =

Jehan Vaillant was a French music composer and theorist.

Jean Vaillant may also refer to:

- Jan Vaillant (1627–1668), Dutch painter
- Jean Vaillant (athlete) (1932–2024), French athlete
- Jean Alexandre Vaillant (1804–1886), French and Romanian teacher and political activist
- Jean Baptiste Vaillant (1751–1837), general of the French Revolutionary Wars and the Napoleonic Wars
- Jean Vaillant, military person from Battle of Mello, 1358
