= Jean Louis Debilly =

French military officer

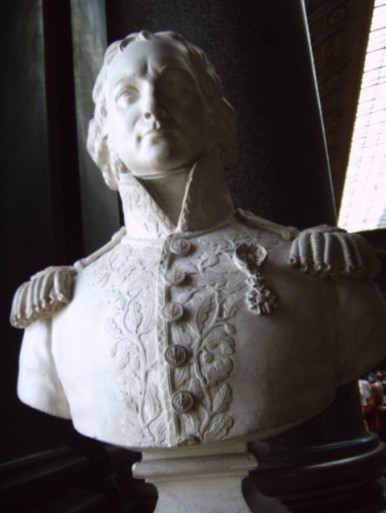
- Bust at the Galerie des Batailles, Palace of Versailles
- Born: 30 July 1763; Dreux, Eure-et-Loir, France
- Died: 14 October 1806 (aged 43) Auerstedt, Kingdom of Prussia
- Branch: Artillery and Infantry
- Service years: 1793–1806
- Rank: Major General
- Conflicts: French Revolutionary Wars; Napoleonic Wars
- Awards: Officer's Grand Cross, Legion of Honor
- Other work: mathematics professor

Jean Louis Debilly (French pronunciation: [ʒɑ̃ lwi dəbili]), General of Brigade in the Grande Armée, was born 30 July 1763 in Dreux, Eure-et-Loir, France, and died 14 October 1806, in the French victory over the Kingdom of Prussia at the Battle of Jena–Auerstedt. On 14 June 1804, he was awarded the Commanders Cross of the Legion of Honor.

== Military service ==
When the French Revolution began in 1789, Jean Louis Debilly was a professor of mathematics in Paris. He joined the Parisian National Guard artillery in 1792, and served for six weeks as provisional commander of the artillery defending the coast at Brest. In June he entered the army, and was promoted to adjutant general. Debilly declined a proffered promotion to remain as General Kléber's chief of staff. He served for a brief time with Army of England, until the Directory abandoned the project. He was transferred to Jean-Baptiste Jourdan's Army of the Danube, where he filled several roles: as commander of cavalry, he supported Dominique Vandamme's detached flank maneuver on Stuttgart, and he was a commander of the left column of the III. Division of the Army at the first Battle of Stockach. He was badly wounded at the French defeat at the First Battle of Zurich in early June 1799, and was unable to ride a horse for several months. Massena promoted him to brigadier general, and assigned him to a staff position as chief artillery and engineers of the III. Division.

In 1806, Debilly was still a brigade commander, but in the I. Division of the III. Corps of Marshal Louis-Nicolas Davout. The 10,000-man I. Division on the French left flank at Auerstadt. Jean Louis Debilly commanded the leading brigade of French infantry marching on Hassenhausen in late morning of 14 October. Facing a cavalry charge, Debilly ordered the infantry to form defensive squares. The infantry absorbed the brunt of a triple Prussian cavalry charge; when the Prussian cavalry recoiled under heavy musketry-fire, the brigade re-formed its line and marched against the supporting Prussian infantry, pushing them back to Lissbach. In the course of this advance, Debilly was killed.

== Family ==
The Debilly family dates to the thirteenth century, when it is mentioned in papers documenting feudal obligations of an écuyer Robert De Billy (squire Robert de Billy) in 1202. Over the course of centuries, the family's fortunes rose and fell; in the late seventeenth century, part of the family emigrated to Canada. Another part, from which Jean Louis Debilly descended, settled near Dreux, Eure-et-Loir.

Jean Louis Debilly married, first, Jeanne Chénnard, and second, Marie-Barbe Saum. His first son, Charles-Louis Debilly, born in 1790, became a page of Napoleon and was raised to the rank of chevalier in 1813; this son married one of the daughters of Honoré Théodore Maxime Gazan de la Peyrière. Another son, Eduard Louis Daniel Debilly (1802–1874) was general of ponts et chaussées (bridges and pavement). There are some claims that he was also a scientist.

== Bibliography ==
- Brown, Howard. War, revolution, and the bureaucratic state: 1791–1799. Oxford: Clarendon Press, 1995, ISBN 978-0-19-820542-5
- (in French) Chaix d'Est-Ange, Gustave. Dictionnaire des familles françaises anciennes ou notables... Évreux: C. Hérissey, 1903-, volume 4.
- Chandler, David. Jena 1806: Napoleon destroys Prussia. London: Osprey, 1993.
- (in French) Chassin, Charles-Louis. La Vendée patriote, 1793–1800. Paris: P. Dupont, 1893–95,
- Petre, F. Loraine. Napoleon's Conquest of Prussia 1806. London: Lane, 1903.
- (in French) Töpffer, Rodolphe and Jacques Droin, Danielle Buyssens, Jean-Daniel Candaux. Correspondance complète. (Complete correspondence of Rodolphe Töpffer). Genève: Droz, 2002, volume 1 ISBN 978-2-600-00666-8.
