= Armand Samuel de Marescot =

French general of engineering

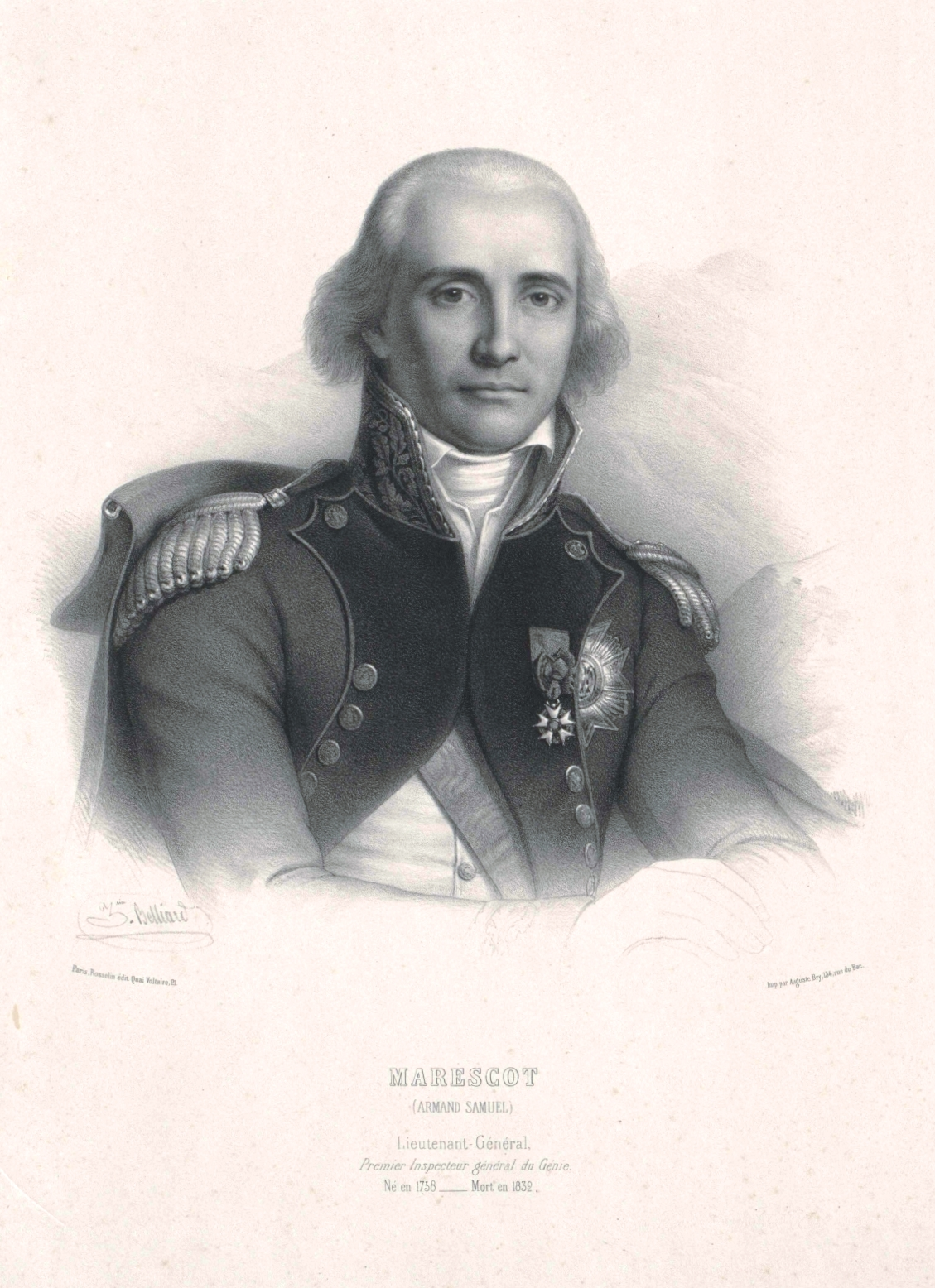
Armand Samuel de Marescot served in the French military as an engineer 1784–1815

Armand Samuel de Marescot (English: /mɑːrˈɛskoʊ/ mar-ESS-koh, French: [aʁmɑ̃ samyɛl də maʁɛsko]; born in Tours on 1 March 1758, died 5 November 1832 at Castle Chaslay near Montoire Loir-et-Cher) was a French general of engineering in the French Revolutionary Wars and the Napoleonic Wars. MARESCOT is one of the names inscribed under the Arc de Triomphe, on Column 14.

== Career ==
In Germany in 1796, he was the commander of Landau on 16 April. He repelled an attack in October 1796 by Friedrich Freiherr von Hotze, then later defended the fortifications of Kehl until its surrender in early 1797.

Subsequently, he was appointed Commander in Chief of Engineering of the Rhine Army, he served at the crossing of the Rhine River at Kehl until 20 April 1797. He was then successively appointed commander of Army engineering in Germany, the commander of engineers in the Army of the Danube 7 March 1799, and then commander of Army engineers of the joint Army of Helvetia and the Army of the Danube under Andre Massena on 30 April 1799. He served in the Swiss campaign until the peace of 1801, and later in the War of the Third Coalition. Subsequently, he fought in the Peninsular War, He was often described as Napoleon's Vauban.

=== His Titles under Napoleon ===
- President of the committee of fortifications.
- Premier inspector general of engineers in 1804.
- Grand Eagle of the Legion of Honor in 1805.
- Count of the Empire in 1808.

He died at Castle Chaslay near Montoire Loir-et-Cher on 25 December 1832. His name is on the east side of the Arc de Triomphe.

== See also ==
- List of French generals of the Revolutionary and Napoleonic Wars

== Sources ==
- Six, Georges (1934). Dictionnaire biographique des généraux et amiraux de la Révolution et de l'Empire, Vol. II (in French). Paris, France: Librairie historique et nobiliaire. ISBN 978-2-402-49916-3.
