= André Joseph Lemaire =

French army general

- Born: 6 March 1738; Cuincy
- Died: 24 October 1802 (aged 64); Dunkirk
- Occupation: General of artillery

André Joseph Lemaire (6 March 1759 – 24 October 1802) was a French general of artillery during the French Revolutionary Wars. He served in Jean-Baptiste Jourdan's Army of the Danube in the invasion of southwestern Germany in 1799. He retired after the Treaty of Lunéville in 1800 and died in 1802.

== Bibliography ==
- Karl Bleibtreu: Marschälle, Generäle, Soldaten Napoleons I: VRZ-Verlag, Hamburg 1999, ISBN 3-931482-63-4 (Nachdr. d. Ausg. Berlin 1899).
- Pierre Daudruy: Le général de division André Joseph Lemaire et sa descendance. Dunkerque 1951.
- Six, Georges (1934). "Lemaire (André-Joseph)". Dictionnaire biographique des généraux et amiraux français de la Révolution et de l'Empire: 1792–1814 (in French). Vol. 2. Paris: Librairie Historique et Nobilaire. p. 103.
