= Jean-Baptiste Jacopin =

French general

Jean Baptiste Jacopin (20 October 1755, Brioude – 28 May 1811), was a French General during the French Revolutionary Wars and the Napoleonic Wars. He was appointed Adjutant General and Chief of Brigade on 28 November 1793, and General of Brigade on 10 January 1794. Napoleon awarded him the Commander of the Legion of Honor on 14 June 1804. As part of Pierre Marie Barthélemy Ferino's I. Division of the Army of the Danube, he participated in the Battle of Ostrach and the Battle of Stockach.
