= Jean Fabre de La Martillière =

French military commander (1732–1819)

Jean Fabre de la Martillière (French pronunciation: [ʒɑ̃ fabʁ də la maʁtiljɛʁ]; 10 March 1732 in Nîmes – 27 March 1819 in Paris) was a general of artillery in the French Revolutionary Wars and the Napoleonic Wars and French politician.

== Military career ==
La Martillière commanded the artillery park of the Army of the Rhine (1797) and successively the Army of Mayence (1798) and the Army of the Danube, 1799. Following the reorganization of the Army of the Danube in April 1799, he was attached to André Masséna's Army of Helvetia. He participated in the Ostrach, Stockach, and Zurich, after which he was transferred to northern Italy, where he was at the Battle of Novi and the Battle of Marengo.

After the Peace of Lunéville in 1801, he became a member of the Central Committee of Artillery and Inspector General of Artillery. Napoleon appointed him to the Senate on 4 January 1802. In 1808, Napoleon raised him to Count of the Empire.

Having voted for the downfall of Napoleon I during the first Restoration, he was called to the Chamber of Peers 4 June 1814. He was appointed inspector of the Polytechnic School in 1816. Louis XVIII confirmed his titles of Count and Peer of France by royal decree of 31 August 1817. He died in 1819, at the age of 87 years.

== Works ==
- Recherches sur les meilleurs effets à obtenir de l'artillerie; Paris, 1812
- Réflexions sur la fabrication en général des bouches à feu; Paris, 1817
