= Christophe Ossvald =

French general (1737–?)

- Born: 25 March 1737; Sarralbe, France
- Military career
- Allegiance: Kingdom of France; First French Republic
- Branch: Royal French Army; French Revolutionary Army
- Service years: 1752–1803
- Rank: General de brigade
- Commands: 10th Cavalry Regiment
- Conflicts: Seven Years' War; Invasion of Hanover; French Revolutionary Wars

Christophe Ossvald (25 March 1737 – ?) was a French general who spent over half a century in service of the Kingdom of France and later the French First Republic.

== Biography ==
Ossvald was born 25 March 1737 in the town of Sarralbe. He enlisted in the Royal French Army in 1752, serving in the Picardie Infantry Regiment. He participated in the Invasion of Hanover during the Seven Years' War, and afterwards transferred to the cavalry. He progressed through the non-commissioned ranks and became an officer in 1789. After the French Revolution broke out he and his regiment became part of the French Revolutionary Army. With his unit, now titled 10th Cavalry Regiment, he was assigned to the Army of the North. On 21 March 1794, he was named chef de brigade and gained command of the regiment.

On 22 June 1794, he received a provisional promotion to general de brigade by General Jean-Baptiste Kléber, and then commanded a cavalry brigade in the Army of Sambre and Meuse. The rank became permanent in the next year and he continued to lead cavalry units; participating in the invasion of southwestern Germany and Switzerland with the Army of the Danube in 1799. In the later campaign, he was assigned to the Artillery Park, under command of Jean Ambroise Baston de Lariboisière.

In 1800, he was made commander of the troops in the Department Mont-Tonnerre. He retired from military service in 1803, moving to Worms.
