= Jean Christophe Collin =

French general

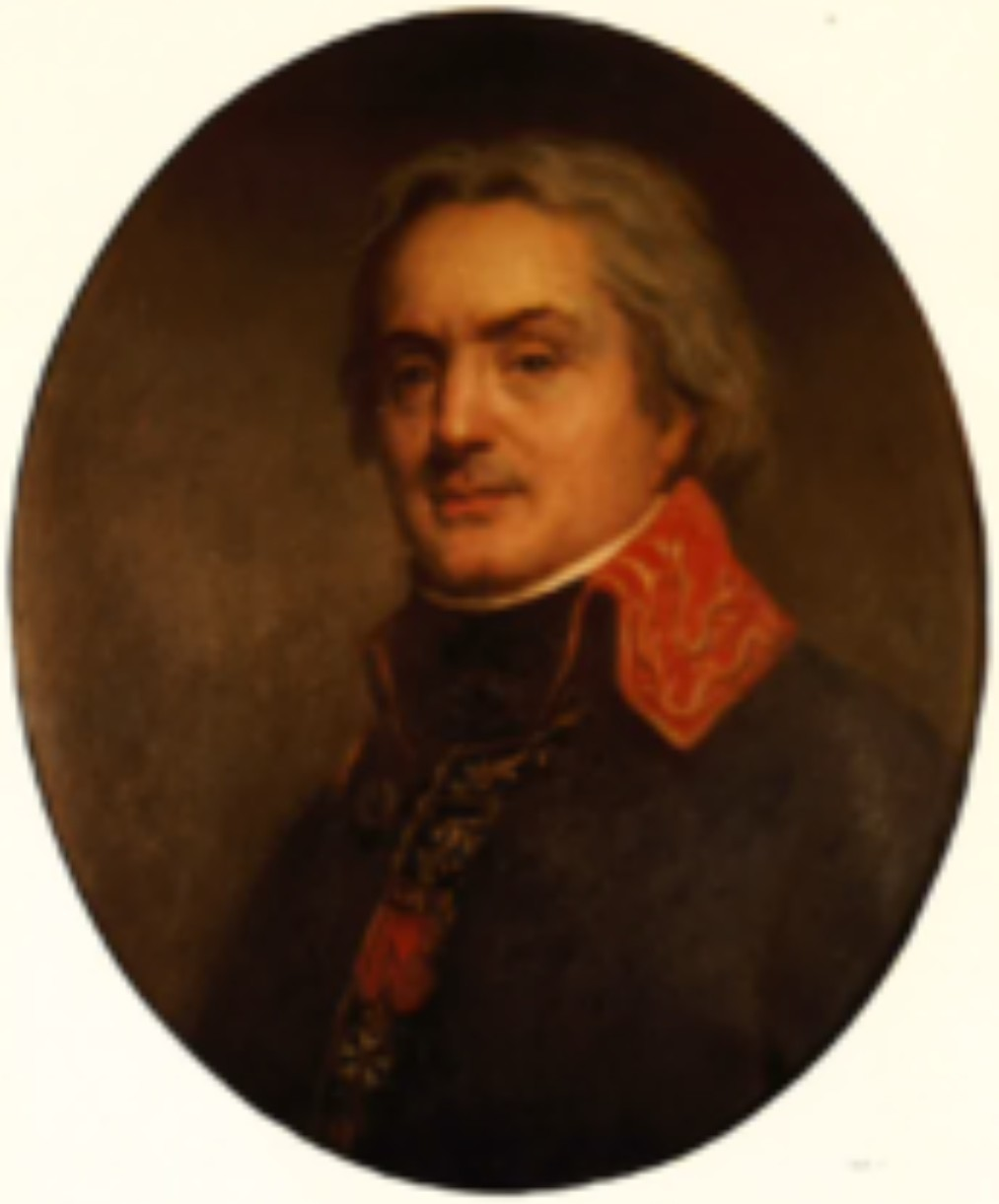

Jean Christophe Collin, called Verdière (18 January 1754 – 18 October 1806), was a French general of Cavalry in the French Revolutionary Wars and the Napoleonic Wars.

Born in Paris, son of Christopher Collin (Colin) of La Verdière, he was a volunteer in the Dragoons in 1767. He became captain of Hussars of Lauzun in 1778, a colonel of the Paris Cavalry in 1789, and a brigadier in 1795. He helped to quell the royalist insurrection of 5 October 1795, and joined the Army of Italy in 1796. He commanded the garrison at Paris in 1797, and was appointed General of division the following year. Subsequently, he participated in the campaigns of the Army of the Danube in 1799, at the Battle of Ostrach and the Stockach; later that year, he participated in Andre Massena's campaigns in northeastern Switzerland, at the First Battle of Zurich.

He was part of the Grand Army of 1802–1806, and was injured at the Battle of Jena-Auerstadt. He died a few days after the battle.
