= Saint-Rémy-en-Comté =

- Commune
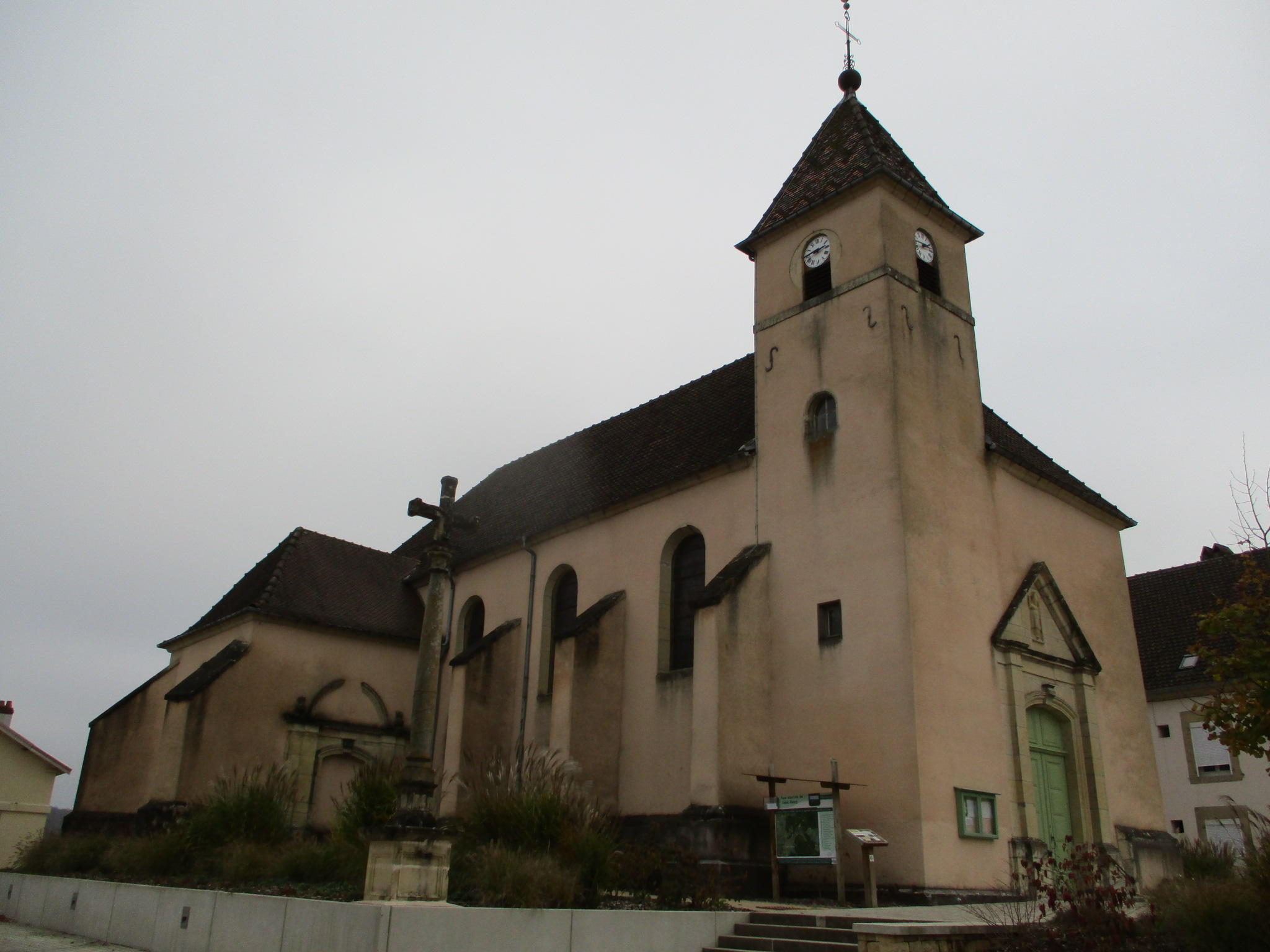
- The church in Saint-Rémy-en-Comté

- Coat of arms
- Location of Saint-Rémy-en-Comté
- Location within France Location within Bourgogne-Franche-Comté
- Coordinates: 47°50′10″N 6°05′47″E
- Country: France
- Region: Bourgogne-Franche-Comté
- Department: Haute-Saône
- Arrondissement: Vesoul
- Canton: Port-sur-Saône
- Intercommunality: CC Terres de Saône

Government
  - Mayor (2026–32): Christian Pinot
- Area^{1}: 9.08 km^{2} (3.51 sq mi)
- Highest elevation: 366 m (1,201 ft)
- Lowest elevation: 226 m (741 ft)
- Population (2023): 436
  - Density: 48.0/km^{2} (124/sq mi)
- Time zone: UTC+01:00 (CET)
  - Summer (DST): UTC+02:00 (CEST)
- INSEE/Postal code: 70472 /70160
- Website: saint-remy70.fr
- ^{1} French Land Register data, which excludes lakes, ponds, glaciers > 1 km^{2} (0.386 sq mi or 247 acres) and river estuaries.

Saint-Rémy-en-Comté (French pronunciation: [sɛ̃ ʁemi ɑ̃ kɔ̃te]; before 2018: Saint-Remy) is a commune in the Haute-Saône department in the region of Bourgogne-Franche-Comté in eastern France.

== See also ==
- Communes of the Haute-Saône department
