= François-Xavier Octavie Fontaine =

French soldier (1762–1812)

- Born: November 7, 1762; Saint-Remy, Haute-Saône
- Died: May 17, 1812 (aged 49); Paris
- Military career
- Allegiance: Kingdom of France; Kingdom of France; French First Republic; First French Empire
- Conflicts: American Revolutionary War; French Revolutionary Wars; Napoleonic Wars
- Awards: Baron of the Empire

François-Xavier Octavie Fontaine (7 November 1762, in Saint-Remy, Haute-Saône – 17 May 1812, in Paris) served in the French military in the American War of Independence, the French Revolutionary Wars, and the Napoleonic Wars.

== Biography ==
Fontaine enlisted in 1778 and participated in the American Revolution from 1779 to 1782, under command of Rochambeau. In particular, he distinguished himself at the Siege of Pensacola in 1781.

Wounded at the Siege of Menin, receiving a bayonet stab in the chest. On 1 May 1793, he was appointed lieutenant in the 19th Regiment of Chasseurs, and campaigned in Vendée during the revolt. He was also part of the expedition to Ireland.

At the Battle of Ostrach, he was attached to the Advanced Guard, commanded by François Joseph Lefebvre, and he was caught between the Austrian and French fire at the village of Hosskirch; his troops took heavy casualties. Unable to escape from the village without being defeated, he took advantage of a thick fog to hide his column. He maneuvered through the channel of the Ostrach and managed to join with the 2nd Division at Riedhausen. Jourdan praised him for his coolness and courage under fire in this dangerous and difficult withdrawal. Later that same year, while in the Army of the Rhine, he was at the siege of Philipsburg.

Following the campaigns against Austria and Prussia in 1805 and 1806, he went to Spain, where he participated in the Peninsular War. He returned to France in 1810; Napoleon raised him to baron of the empire and he died in Paris, 17 May 1812.
