= François Goullus =

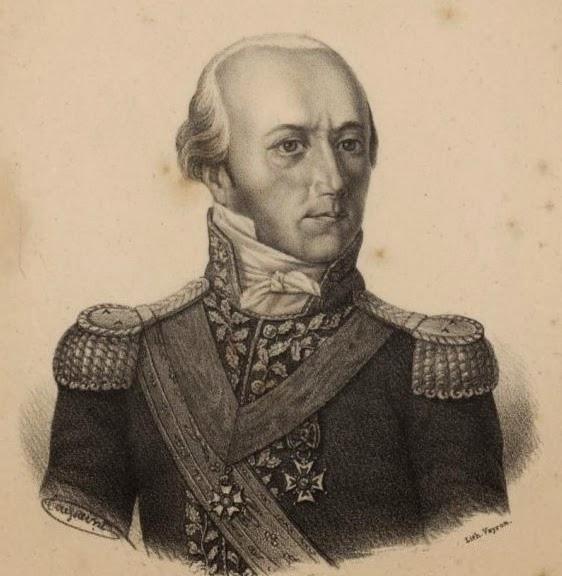
François Goullus

François Goullus, was a brigadier general and baron of the First French Empire during the French Revolutionary Wars and the Napoleonic Wars.

== Biography ==
Goullus was born 4 November 1758 in Lyon (Rhone), entered service as a soldier 28 October 1776 in the regiment of the Crown (45th Infantry), and was successively promoted to corporal on 1 December 1778, sergeant on 28 November 1779, Staff Sergeant on 22 June 1787, and Warrant officer on 24 December 1789.

He received a second lieutenant's commission on 15 September 1791, was immediately promoted to first lieutenant and obtained the rank of captain 26 September 1792. The firmness with which he defended the passage of the Suippe against the Black Legion attracted the attention of the commander, who appointed him lieutenant colonel on 30 October 1792.

At Battle of Jemmapes he commanded the 2nd Battalion of the 45th Regiment, almost entirely composed of recruits. After the Siege of Namur, which he had helped to organize, Goullus had the command of the city and its castle.

In 1799, as part of the Army of the Danube, he crossed the Rhine near Basel. After the Battle of Ostrach, Goulus supported the retreat of part of the army from Pfullendorf. Later, he orchestrated a complicated crossing of the Oberhin, the High Rhine, by the convent of Paradies, and took the village of Buzingen at bayonet point. He also participated in the second Battle of Stockach on 3 May 1800, the Battle of Messkirch of 5 May 1800, and the Battle of Memmingen on 10 May 1800, where he was wounded by gunshot that went through his right cheek. After the peace in 1801, he was assigned command in Styria, and then in the Haute-Garonne (10 military division).

He was created Baron of the Empire in 1809. He returned to France on leave May 15, 1810, and was appointed commander of weapons in Amsterdam January 2, 1811. In June of that year, he applied for admission to the Order of the Golden Fleece.

He retired on 24 February 1814, General Goullus was named Knight of the Order of Saint Louis on 20 August and died in Brie (Ariège) 7 September of that year.
