= Christoph Karl von Piacsek =

Hungarian military officer

- Born: 1749; Klobusics, Hungary
- Died: 12 June 1799 (aged 49–50)
- Occupation: Officer in Habsburg military service during the French Revolutionary Wars

Christoph Karl von Piacsek was a Hungarian officer in Habsburg military service during the French Revolutionary Wars. He was born in 1749 in Klobusics (Hungarian: Klobusic; Czech: Klobušice), in the commune of Trencsén, in the Kingdom of Hungary. As a Rittmeister, or captain of cavalry, in the 9th Hussar Regiment, he received the Knight's Cross of the Military Order of Maria Theresa in 1789, after combat in Tabor during Austria's wars with the Ottoman Empire, and, as a colonel, commanded the 9th Hussars, 1793–1797. In 1793, during the War of the First Coalition, the 9th Hussars were part of the Army of the Rhine (Austrian), and participated in the skirmishes at Offenbach, Knittelsbach, and Otterheim, and, later, at the storming of the Wissembourg line at Lauffenberg. Following this action, Piacsek, Major Baron von Szoreyny, and several other officers were honored.

He was promoted to colonel (Oberst) in 1793, and major general 17 March 1797 (effective 12 May 1797). Injured on 25 May 1799 at a clash between the troops of André Masséna and Friedrich Freiherr von Hotze at Frauenfeld, near Schaffhausen, he died of his wounds on 12 June 1799.

== Sources ==
=== Bibliography ===
- Kudrna, Leopold and Digby Smith. A biographical dictionary of all Austrian Generals in the French Revolutionary and Napoleonic Wars, 1792–1815. “Piacsek”. Napoleon Series, Robert Burnham, editor in chief. April 2008 version. Accessed 14 December 2009.
- (in German) Wrede, Alphons. Geschichte der K. [und] K. Wehrmacht. Volume 3. Wein: Seidel and Sohn, 1901.
