= Jean-François Barbier =

French general (1754–1828)

Jean-François-Thérèse Barbier (French pronunciation: [ʒɑ̃ fʁɑ̃swa teʁɛz baʁbje]; 3 December 1754, Strasbourg, (Bas-Rhin) – 6 May 1828, Strasbourg) was a French general during the French Revolutionary Wars and the Napoleonic Wars.

== Biography ==
Barbier was born on 3 December 1754 in Strasbourg and entered military service as a second lieutenant in the regiment of Hussars Chamborant, part of the second Army.

Barbier became lieutenant in 1785 and participated in the campaigns of the Revolution of 1792 and 1793 in the Army of the North, attaining the rank of captain on January 25, 1792. Appointed squadron leader on 25 November 1792, he reached the rank of colonel on 15 May 1793. In that same year, during the Reign of Terror, he was dismissed from the army by the representative on mission Duquesnoy, a radical revolutionary, and brought before the criminal court of the Army of the North. Barbier was subsequently acquitted and reinstated to his position by Denis-Étienne Laurent on 10 February 1794.

Subsequently, he participated in all the campaigns of the Revolutionary Wars of 1794, 1795, and 1796 in the Armies of the Rhine, the North, the Sambre & Meuse, and the campaigns of 1797–1800 in southern Germany and Switzerland.

In 1802, he was employed in the Army of Hanover under the command of Bernadotte. His services were rewarded on 24 January 1804 by the Knight's Cross of the Legion of Honour. 15 June after he was made an Officer of the Order.

He came to the notice of the Emperor Napoleon at the Battle of Austerlitz, where he was hit in the neck by a musket ball, on 2 December 1805, which earned him his appointment to the rank of Commander of the Legion of Honor on 25 December 1805.

He participated in the Prussian campaign (1806) and a few days before the Battle of Jena-Auerstadt, he was promoted to brigadier general on 7 October 1806.

Appointed Baron of the Empire in 1808, he assigned in the Trasimène department to supervise recruitment and training.

Admitted to retirement on 1 September 1814, he came out of retirement in the Restoration. He retired on 25 November 1818 to Strasbourg and died on 6 May 1828.

== Promotions ==
He received the following promotions:

- Second Lieutenant, Hussars Chamborant, 1781
- Lieutenant, 1785
- Captain, 25 January 1791
- Chef d'escadrons, 25 November 1792
- Colonel, Second Hussars, 15 May 1793.
- General of Brigade, 7 October 1806

== Notes, Citations, and Sources ==
=== Sources ===
- (in French) Biographie nouvelle des Contemporains, Volume 2: p. 97. France, 1821.
