= Charles Saligny de San-Germano =

French military leader (1772–1809)

- Born: September 12, 1772; Vitry-le-François
- Died: February 2, 1809 (aged 36); Madrid
- Military career
- Conflicts: French Revolutionary Wars; Napoleonic Wars

Charles Saligny de San-Germano (French pronunciation: [ʃaʁl saliɲi də san dʒɛʁmano]) was a French military leader in the French Revolutionary Wars and the Napoleonic Wars. Saligny was born 12 September 1772 in Vitry-le-François. He was promoted to general of division on 1 January 1805.

Saligny married Rosine-Antoine de Saint-Joseph, a relative of the wife of Joseph Bonaparte. His wife who chose to be known as Marie-Rose Rosine Clary was of the influential Clary family, she was the cousin by birth of Julie Clary. Through marriage Saligny became brother-in-law to Marshal Suchet, and nephew of both Marshal Bernadotte and Joseph Bonaparte.

He was raised to Duke of San Germano, an Italian title created by Napoleon in the Two Sicilies in March 1806. The title became extinct upon his death on 25 February 1809 in Madrid. He fought at the Battle of Austerlitz.
