= Jean Victor Tharreau =

French general (1767–1812)

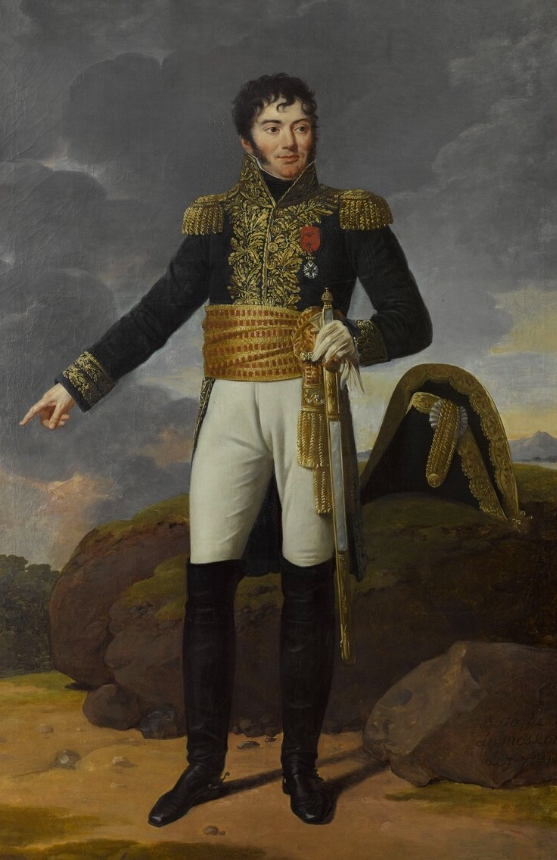
- Portrait by Robert Lefèvre
- Born: 15 January 1767; Bégrolles-en-Mauges, France
- Died: 26 September 1812 (aged 45); Moscow, Russia
- Military career
- Allegiance: France
- Service years: 1792–1812
- Rank: General of Division
- Conflicts: French Revolutionary Wars; Napoleonic Wars; French invasion of Russia †
- Awards: 1809 Legion of Honor

Jean Victor Tharreau or Jean Victor Thareau (French pronunciation: [ʒɑ̃ viktɔʁ taʁo]; 15 January 1767 – 26 September 1812), was a General of Division in the Army of the French Empire.

Tharreau enthusiastically adopted the revolutionary cause and joined the Maine-et-Loire volunteers in 1792. He quickly rose through the command ranks. By 1795, he was chief of staff of the Army of the Ardennes. He helped to defend Zurich in the French army's defeat at the First Battle of Zurich in 1799, and participated in the French victory over the combined Austrian and Russian forces later that summer. After the successes of the 1809 campaign on the Danube, he was part of the jubilant force entering the Habsburg capital of Vienna.

In the 1812 campaign in Russia, he assumed command of the Westphalian army, appointed by Napoleon's brother Jérôme Bonaparte He died as the French Army took Moscow on 26 September 1812, of wounds suffered at the Battle of Borodino.

== Family ==
The Tharreau family originated in the Upper Poitou region of France and after the French Revolution it divided into two branches. One lived in Cholet and the other in Châtillon-sur-Sèvre. The family in Cholet had five sons: François, who served in the legislature as a deputy from Maine-et-Loire from 1808 to 1812; Augustin, who was a doctor; and a third who died young... The Châtillon branch also had five sons: Pierre-Jean-François, born 1755, who became a legislative deputy, and a jurist; Jean-Victor, who became a general in Napoleon's army; and a third who died young.

== Career ==
At the outbreak of the French Revolution, Tharreau enthusiastically adopted the revolutionary cause. In 1792, he joined the Maine-et-Loire volunteers and later that year he was an adjutant major of the 2nd battalion of volunteers of Mayence. In 1794, at the height of the French terror, he was a General of Brigade in the Army of the Ardennes. In 1799, Jean Victor Tharreau was a brigade commander in the French Army of the Danube, and fought at the battles of Ostrach and First Stockach. On 20 April, he was promoted to General of Division. André Masséna placed him command of the forward line, for the defense of the Swiss city of Zurich, in 1799; the insubordination of Jean-de-Dieu Soult at the Battle of Winterthur in May 1799 contributed to Tharreau's inability to hold the forward line, forcing a French retreat on Zurich and the subsequent defeat of the French at the First Battle of Zurich on 4–7 June.

In 1801, he was appointed commandant of the city of Strasbourg. A firm believer in the revolutionary principles, he was dismayed by Napoleon's acquisition of absolute power, although he admired the man's military talents. Napoleon made him a baron on 21 December 1808. In 1809, he commanded the First Division of the II Corps of the Grande Armée, under general command of Marshal Lannes at the battles of Aspern-Essling and Wagram, after which Napoleon made him an Officer of the Légion d’Honneur, on 10 August 1809.

In 1812, he served as General of the 23rd Division, and later replaced Dominique Vandamme who commanded the 8th Army, after Vandamme's recklessness and rudeness had strained his relationship with Jérôme Bonaparte, King of Westphalia, beyond repair. He participated in the Battle of Borodino, where he was mortally wounded. He died of his wounds on 26 September 1812.

== Memorials ==
Tharreau's name is inscribed on the 11th column of the Arc de Triomphe, in Paris. There is also a granite stone at the cemetery in the village of Orvault, in the Loire-Atlantique department of France, on which is inscribed:

To the memory of General of Division Baron Jean-Victor Tharreau, officer of the Legion of Honor, who died of wounds from the Battle of Moscow 7 September 1812.
(A la mémoire du Général de Division, Baron Jean-Victor Tharreau, officier de la Légion d'Honneur, tué à la bataille de la Moskova le 7 septembre 1812".)

In 1810, Tharreau had purchased property in Orvault, the so-called House Plaisance. His wife, Charlotte Martine, remained there until her death in 1850. He had a son, Pierre-André.

== Sources ==
=== Bibliography ===
- Broughton, Tony, Generals Who Served in the French Army during the Period 1789- 1814: Taponier to Turreau de Garambouville. Napoleon Series. Robert Burnham, Editor in Chief. Placed on the Napoleon Series October 2007. Accessed 13 January 2010.
- (in French) Dide, Auguste. La Révolution française: Liste des Membres de la Noblesse Impériale. Paris: La Société, 1889. V. 16.
- Gallagher, John G., Napoleon's enfant terrible: General Dominique Vandamme, Norman OK: University of Oklahoma Press, 2008.
- Jomini, Antoine Henri, baron de, Mountain warfare illustrated by the campaign of 1799 in Switzerland: being a translation of the Swiss narrative, compiled from the works of the Archduke Charles, Jomini, and other...London: Henry S. King, 1875.
- Michaud, Joseph Fr. Biographie universelle, ancienne et moderne, Paris: Michaud frères, 1811–1862. V. 84 (1854).
- (in French) Monnet, Émile . Archives politiques du département des Deux-Sèvres, 1789–1889. Niort, L. Clouzot, 1889. No page numbers.
- Smith, Digby. The Napoleonic Wars Data Book, London: Greenhill, 1998. ISBN 1-85367-276-9
- (in French) Société polymathique du Morbihan. Bulletin de la Société polymathique du Morbihan. Vannes: La Société, 1861–1959.
- (in French) Village Orvault webpage. 13 January 2010 version. Accessed 13 January 2010.
