= Jean Baptiste Vaillant =

- Born: 1751
- Died: 1837 (aged 85–86)
- Allegiance: Kingdom of France; French First Republic
- Service / branch: French Army
- Rank: General of Brigade
- Battles / wars: French Revolutionary Wars; Napoleonic Wars

Simone Jean Baptiste Vaillant (1751–1837) was a general of the French Revolutionary Wars and the Napoleonic Wars. Promoted to General of Brigade 20 May 1795. His 7th Battalion of Artillery was awarded Armes of Honor on 19 April 1803.
