= Pierre Marie Barthélemy Ferino =

French general (1747–1816)

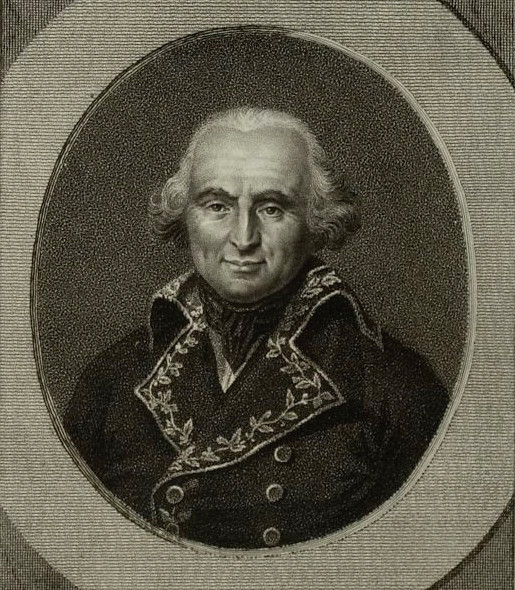
- Pierre Marie Barthélemy Ferino (Musée de la Révolution française)
- Born: 23 August 1747; Craveggia, Piedmont present day Italy
- Died: 28 June 1816 (aged 68) Paris, France
- Allegiance: Habsburg Monarchy until 1789; French Republic; French Empire; Kingdom of France
- Service years: 1792–1815
- Rank: General of Division
- Conflicts: French Revolutionary Wars; Napoleonic Wars
- Awards: Légion d'honneur Count of the Empire; Senator
- Other work: Military Governor of Antwerp

Pierre Marie Barthélemy Ferino (23 August 1747, Craveggia – 28 June 1816, Paris) was a general and politician of France. Born in the Savoyard state, he was the son of a low-ranking officer in the Habsburg military. In 1789, during the French Revolution, he went to France, where he received a commission in the French Army. In 1793, his troops deposed him, for his strict discipline, but he was immediately reinstated and rose rapidly through the ranks of the general staff. He helped to push the Austrians back to Bavaria in the 1796 summer campaign, and then covered Moreau's retreat to France later that year, defending the Rhine bridge at Hüningen until the last units had crossed to safety.

Ferino commanded the southernmost wing of Army of the Danube in 1799, and participated in the battles of Ostrach and Stockach. Napoleon awarded him the Grand Cross of the Legion of Honor in 1804; in 1805, Ferino became a Senator, and in 1808, raised him to Count of the Empire. His name is engraved in the Arc de Triomphe.

== Family ==
Barthélemy Ferino was born in Craveggia, in the Vigezzo valley, near the border of the Swiss Confederation. This section was known as the Piedmont which, at the time of his birth, was under the rule of the House of Savoy. His father, Bernardo Ferino, was an officer of the so-called Bender regiment and served in the Austrian military during the Seven Years' War. Barthélemy Ferino entered Austrian military service in 1768 and in 1779 he was brevetted as captain. His promotions in the Habsburg military were few. Responding to perceived inequalities, at the time of the French Revolution he moved to France and, in 1792, acquired a commission in the French army.

== Service in French Revolutionary Wars ==
On 1 August 1792, he was named lieutenant colonel of the Legion of Biron, also called the Chasseurs of the Rhine, part of the Army of the Rhine under the over-all command of Philippe Custine. Ferino was named general of brigade in December, and on 23 August 1793, he became general of division, in command of the advance guard. Although he was deposed for maintaining discipline too strictly, he was immediately reinstated; he was assigned to the Army of the Moselle under the command of Jean Victor Moreau. In 1795, he was appointed Lieutenant General of the Army of the Rhine and Moselle, and in 1796, Commander of the Army of the Rhine and Moselle, Right Wing. With this force, he participated in the Battle of Landau, and helped Moreau and Jean-Baptiste Jourdan to push the Austrian army from the Rhineland into Bavaria in the 1796 summer campaign. He defeated the Conde's Emigré Army at Bregenz, on Lake Constance. In the subsequent Austrian resurgence, he maintained the right flank's protective cover of Moreau's main army as the French retreated through southern Germany in August and September of that year; he participated in the Battle of Schliengen. When the French withdrew after Schliengen, he defended the Rhine crossing at Hüningen, north of the Swiss city of Basel, until the last French units crossed the river to safety.

During the attempted royalist coup in 1797, Ferino was accused of having royalist leanings and removed from his command, but restored to active duty in 1798 as part of the Army of the Mainz (French: Armée de Mayence). He continued the rigorous discipline for which he became known and his troops maintained good order, despite the many abuses by other troops that occurred in the Rhine region. In late 1798, he commanded the former Army of the Mainz, now called the Army of Observation when, in November, Jean Baptiste Jourdan assumed command and organized the army for the planned invasion of southern Germany in 1799.

In the War of the Second Coalition, as commander of the I. Division of the Army of the Danube, Ferino led the division across the Rhine River at Hüningen, passed through the Duchy of Baden and marched toward Schaffhausen. He was familiar with this territory from the 1796 campaign. His division secured the right flank for Jourdan's main force for the Battle of Ostrach on 21 March 1799. Although his troops remained outside of the primary battle zone, during the retreat, a portion of his column was cut off by Archduke Charles' army, and captured.

In the French withdrawal from Ostrach, he again secured the flank, and retraced his steps west toward Bodman, a small village on the furthest western point of Lake Constance, near Stockach. From there, he guarded the main army against an Austrian approach from Switzerland at the Stockach in March 1799.

While maintaining a cordon between the Austrian forces approaching from Switzerland, under command of Baron von Hotze, most of Ferino's division participated in a simultaneous assault in the first hours of the engagement at Stockach. With part of Joseph Souham's Center (the II. Division of the Army of the Danube), they assaulted the Austrian left, but were stopped by overwhelming numbers. Ferino tried to attack again, initiating his assault with a cannonade, followed by an attack through the woods on both sides of the road between Asch and Stockach. Two columns made two attacks, both of which were repulsed; finally, Ferino added his third column to the assault, which resulted in the Austrian reformation of the line, cannons at the center firing a heavy cannonade. Ferino could not respond, because he had run out of artillery ammunition, but his troops fixed bayonets and charged the village of Wahlwiess, capturing it despite the heavy fire and massive numbers. They were forced to relinquish the village at darkness.

== Relationship with Napoleon ==
Immediately after the coup of 18 brumaire, Napoleon appointed Ferino as commander of the 8th Division. He became a member and grand officer of the Légion d'honneur on 19 frimaire, and 25 prairial, respectively. Napoleon appointed him to the Senate of Florence, and made him a Count of the Empire in 1808, and then appointed him as military governor of the Netherlands. In 1813, Ferino organized the National Guard of the Netherlands.

== Relationship in the Restoration ==
As a member of the French Senate, Ferino voted to request Napoleon's abdication in 1814 and in 1815 did not participate in the Hundred Days, Napoleon's return from exile on Elba. After the restoration, Louis XVIII maintained Ferino's honors and rank, and awarded him a certificate of naturalized citizenship. This allowed him to continue to sit in the new Chamber of Peers. Férino died in Paris on 28 June 1816. His name is engraved on the Arc de Triomphe in Paris.

== Sources ==
- Jourdan, Jean-Baptiste. A Memoir of the Operations of the Army of the Danube under the command of General Jourdan. London: Debrett, 1799.
- Mullié, Charles (1852). "Férino (Pierre-Marie-Barthélemy, comte)" . Biographie des célébrités militaires des armées de terre et de mer de 1789 à 1850 (in French). Paris: Poignavant et Compagnie.
- Phipps, Ramsay Weston, The Armies of the First French Republic, Oxford: Oxford University Press, 1939. Volume 5.
- Sahlins, Peter. Unnaturally French. Ithaca, N.Y.: Cornell University Press, 2004, ISBN 0-8014-4142-0.
- Whitelaw, A. "Barthélemy Ferino." The Popular Conversations Lexicon. London: Blackie and Sons, 1874. Volume 4.
- The article was derived in part or in sum from the French Wikipedia article of the same name.
