= Army of Helvetia =

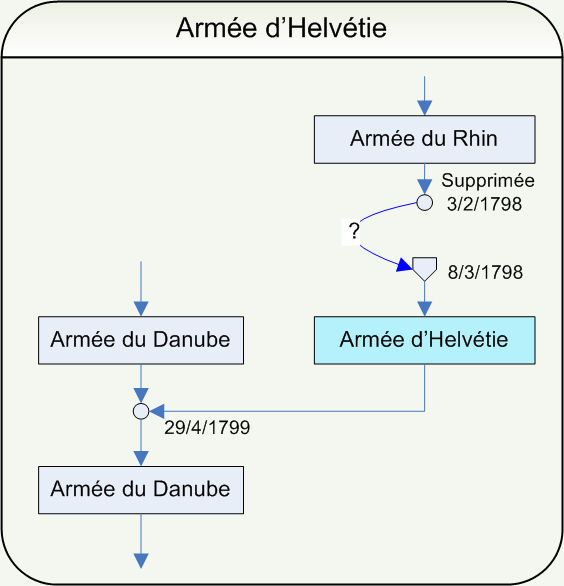
Évolution de l'armée d'Helvétie

The Army of Helvetia, or (French: Armée d'Helvétie), was a command of the French Revolutionary Army. It was formed on 8 March 1798 from the remnants of the first unit to be known as the Army of the Rhine. It was officially merged into the command structure of the Army of the Danube on 29 April 1799, although it continued to operate in the Swiss theater until 1801. The Army's initial campaigning in the old Swiss Confederation resulted in severe setbacks and defeats at Feldkirch, Lusiensteig, and Zurich.

== Background ==
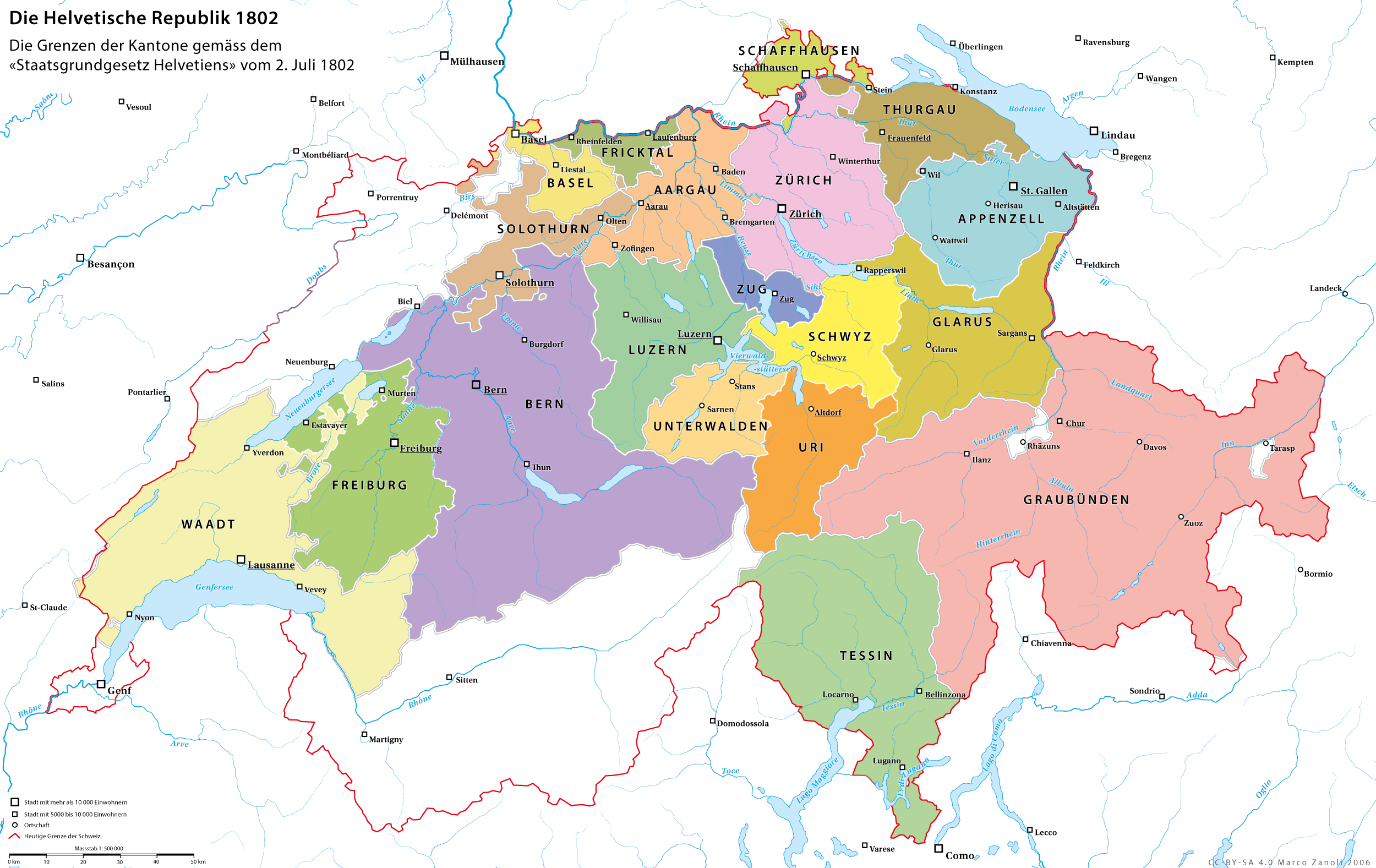
Helvetic Republic, with borders as at the Second Helvetic constitution of 25 May 1802

From October 1797 until 1–2 March 1798, when the French crossed the Rhine into Germany, the signatories of the Treaty of Campo Formio had avoided armed conflict. Several diplomatic incidents undermined this agreement: the reluctance of the Austrians to cede the designated territories; the ineptitude of Second Congress of Rastatt to orchestrate the transfer of additional territories that would compensate the German princes for their losses; the refusal of Ferdinand of Naples to pay tribute, followed by the Neapolitan rebellion; and the subsequent establishment of the Parthenopaean Republic. Other factors contributed to the rising tensions as well. On his way to Egypt, Napoleon had stopped on the Island of Malta and forcibly removed the Knights of Malta from their possessions, angering Tsar Paul I of Russia, who was the honorary head of the order. The French Directory, furthermore, was convinced that the Austrians were conniving to start another war. The weaker the French Republic seemed, the more the Austrians, the Neapolitans, the Russians and the English were discussing this possibility.

=== The Fall of the Swiss Confederation ===
On 12 April 1798 121 deputies of the various cantons established the Helvetic Republic by proclamation as "One and Indivisible". The new regime abolished both cantonal sovereignty, or the practice of particular local governance, and feudal rights, and established a centralized state based on the ideas of the French Revolution. This change in governing structure was backed up by military force, through the presence of French soldiers.

== Composition ==
Regiments which served in the army included:

Cavalry

- 7th Regiment of Mounted Hunters 7éme Régiment de Chasseurs à Cheval (Picarde)
- 12th Regiment of Mounted Hunters 12éme Régiment de Chasseurs à Cheval (Ardennes)
- 7th Regiment of Hussars 7éme Régiment de Hussards
- 8th Regiment of Hussars 8éme Régiment de Hussards
- 9th Regiment of Hussars 9éme Régiment de Hussards
- 11th Regiment of Hussars 11éme Régiment de Hussards
- 9th Regiment of Dragoons 9éme Régiment de Dragons
- 13th Regiment of Dragoons 13éme Régiment de Dragons (Monsieur)
- 16th Regiment of Dragoons 16éme Régiment de Dragons (Orleans)
- 3rd Regiment of Cavalry 3éme Régiment de Cavalerie (Commisaire Général) – Later 3rd Cuirassiers
- 18th Regiment of Cavalry 18éme Régiment de Cavalerie (Normandie) – Later 27th Dragoons

Infantry

- 3rd Demi-Brigade of Line Infantry 3éme Demi-Brigade d'Infanterie de Ligne
- 17th Demi-Brigade of Line Infantry 17éme Demi-Brigade d'Infanterie de Ligne
- 18th Demi-Brigade of Line Infantry 18éme Demi-Brigade d'Infanterie de Ligne
- 23rd Demi-Brigade of Line Infantry 23éme Demi-Brigade d'Infanterie de Ligne
- 31st Demi-Brigade of Line Infantry 31éme Demi-Brigade d'Infanterie de Ligne
- 36th Demi-Brigade of Line Infantry 36éme Demi-Brigade d'Infanterie de Ligne
- 37th Demi-Brigade of Line Infantry 37éme Demi-Brigade d'Infanterie de Ligne
- 38th Demi-Brigade of Line Infantry 38éme Demi-Brigade d'Infanterie de Ligne
- 44th Demi-Brigade of Line Infantry 44éme Demi-Brigade d'Infanterie de Ligne
- 57th Demi-Brigade of Line Infantry 57éme Demi-Brigade d'Infanterie de Ligne
- 76th Demi-Brigade of Line Infantry 76éme Demi-Brigade d'Infanterie de Ligne
- 84th Demi-Brigade of Line Infantry 84éme Demi-Brigade d'Infanterie de Ligne
- 97th Demi-Brigade of Line Infantry 97éme Demi-Brigade d'Infanterie de Ligne
- 100th Demi-Brigade of Line Infantry 100éme Demi-Brigade d'Infanterie de Ligne
- 103rd Demi-Brigade of Line Infantry 103éme Demi-Brigade d'Infanterie de Ligne
- 105th Demi-Brigade of Line Infantry 105éme Demi-Brigade d'Infanterie de Ligne
- 106th Demi-Brigade of Line Infantry 106éme Demi-Brigade d'Infanterie de Ligne
- 109th Demi-Brigade of Line Infantry 109éme Demi-Brigade d'Infanterie de Ligne
- 5th Light Demi-Brigade 5éme Demi-Brigade Légère
- 14th Light Demi-Brigade 14éme Demi-Brigade Légère
- 16th Light Demi-Brigade 16éme Demi-Brigade Légère
- 18th Light Demi-Brigade 18éme Demi-Brigade Légère
- 20th Light Demi-Brigade 20éme Demi-Brigade Légère

Swiss Troops

- 1st Swiss Demi-Brigade of Line Infantry 1ére Suisse Demi-Brigade d'Infanterie de Ligne
- 2nd Swiss Demi-Brigade of Line Infantry 2éme Suisse Demi-Brigade d'Infanterie de Ligne
- 3rd Swiss Demi-Brigade of Line Infantry 3éme Suisse Demi-Brigade d'Infanterie de Ligne
- 4th Swiss Demi-Brigade of Line Infantry 4éme Suisse Demi-Brigade d'Infanterie de Ligne
- 5th Swiss Demi-Brigade of Line Infantry 5éme Suisse Demi-Brigade d'Infanterie de Ligne
- 6th Swiss Demi-Brigade of Line Infantry 6éme Suisse Demi-Brigade d'Infanterie de Ligne
- 1st Swiss Legion 1ére Légion Helvétique – Disbanded 6 September 1799
- 2nd Swiss Legion 2éme Légion Helvétique – Disbanded 6 September 1799

== Commanders ==
Commanders of the army included:

- 8 March 1798–27 March 1798 Général Guillaume Marie-Anne Brune
- 28 March 1798–10 December 1798 Temporarily Général Alexis Henri Schauenburg
- 11 December 1798–4 April 1799 Général Jean-Baptiste Jourdan
- 5 April–16 April 1799 Général Philippe Romain Ménard
- 17 April–18 April 1799 Général André Masséna
