= Dominique Vandamme =

French military officer (1770–1830)

Dominique Joseph René Vandamme
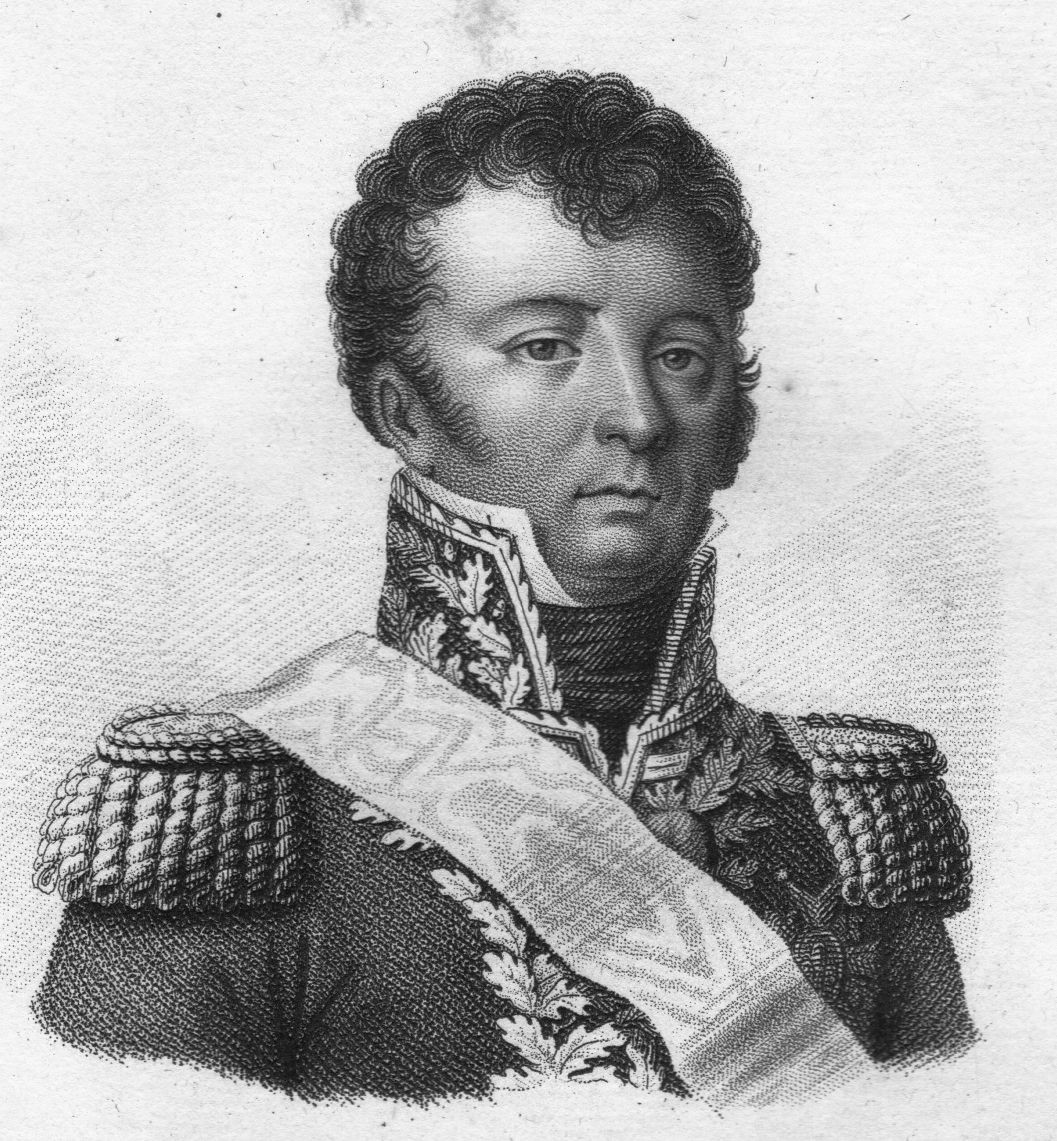
- Dominique-Joseph René Vandamme
- Born: 5 November 1770; Cassel, France
- Died: 15 July 1830 (aged 59); Cassel, France
- Military career
- Allegiance: Kingdom of France; Kingdom of the French; French First Republic; First French Empire; Bourbon Restoration
- Branch: French Army
- Service years: 1786–1815; 1820–1825
- Rank: General of Division
- Commands: I Corps; III Corps
- Conflicts: French Revolutionary Wars; Napoleonic Wars
- Awards: Legion of Honour (Grand Cross)

General Dominique-Joseph René Vandamme, Count of Unseburg (French pronunciation: [dɔminik ʒozɛf ʁəne vɑ̃dam]; 5 November 1770, in Cassel, Nord – 15 July 1830) was a French military officer, who fought in the Napoleonic Wars. He was a dedicated career soldier with a reputation as an excellent division and corps commander. However, he had a nasty disposition that alienated his colleagues, and would publicly criticize Napoleon, who never appointed him marshal.

== Biography ==
Vandamme enlisted in the army in 1786 and rapidly rose through the ranks. At the outbreak of the French Revolutionary Wars in 1793 he was a Brigadier General. He served in this rank in the campaigns of 1794 in the Low Countries, 1795 on the Rhine and 1796 in Germany. He was court-martialled for looting and suspended. Reinstated, he fought at the First Battle of Stockach on 25 March 1799, but disagreement with General Jean Moreau led to his being sent to occupation duties in Holland and involvement in the Battle of Castricum. At the Battle of Austerlitz in 1805, he led his division, alongside Gen. St. Hilaire's, as part of Marshal Soult's IV Corps in the charge that captured the Pratzen Heights. For his leadership he was awarded the Grand Eagle of the Legion of Honour.

In 1806-7 Vandamme's forces besieged Breslau, and after finally taking it he ordered the fortifications to be levelled. He was named Count of Unsebourg by Napoleon I after the Silesian campaign during the War of the Fourth Coalition. In the campaign of 1809, he led a small allied corps from Württemberg in the battles of Abensberg, Landshut, and Eckmühl.

He took part in the 1812 invasion of Russia as the commander of the 8th corps under Jérôme Bonaparte. The worsening supply problems during the march and general privations of his soldiers made Vandamme send several letters of concern to both Napoleon and Jerome which were not received well by either. A few days after the capture of Grodno, Vandamme sent another letter of complaints to Jerome and asked to be relieved of his command unless steps were taken to improve conditions for both his, and other corps of the army. Jerome took him up on his offer and relieved Vandamme and assigned command of his corps to General Jean Victor Tharreau. Apparently Vandamme had not expected his offer to resign to be accepted and he sent letters of protest to both Napoleon and Jerome but to no avail. Vandamme was sent home to France by Louis-Alexandre Berthier.

Reportedly a brutal and violent soldier, renowned for insubordination and looting, Napoleon is said to have told Vandamme, "If I had two of you, the only solution would be to have one hang the other". Napoleon later also commented: "If I were to launch a campaign against Lucifer in Hell, Vandamme would be at my back."

In the campaign of 1813, Vandamme's I Corps attacked the Allied Army of Bohemia as it tried to retreat after the Battle of Dresden. While his troops were engaged in the Battle of Kulm, a corps led by the Prussian General Friedrich Graf Kleist von Nollendorf fortuitously attacked the French from the rear. In the consequent disaster, Vandamme and 13,000 of his men were captured. When captured, the Russian Czar accused him of looting; to which he replied, “At least I have not been accused of killing my Father”. An allusion to the conspiracy Alexander was involved in to displace his father. He appears to have been treated with special harshness because of this, and at the end of the war, he was forbidden to enter Paris and sent to Cassel by Louis XVIII. He was thus free of all obligations towards the Bourbons, and when Napoleon returned, joined him without hesitation. The emperor made him a peer of France.

In the campaign of 1815 Vandamme was in command of the III Corps, under the direction of Marshal Emmanuel Grouchy. He urged Grouchy to join Napoleon at the Battle of Waterloo, but Grouchy preferred to pursue the Prussian 3rd Corps under General Johann von Thielmann, winning the Battle of Wavre, but losing the war. Vandamme's troops were subsequently checked by the Prussians at the Battle of Issy. After the restoration of Louis XVIII, Vandamme was exiled to America and settled in Philadelphia amongst other French military exiles. General Vandamme was allowed to return to France by the ordinance of 1 December 1819. He was re-established in the service in the Ètat-major Général, until his final retirement on 1 January 1825. Afterwards, he lived alternatively in Cassel and Ghent, occupying himself with the writing of his memoirs. He died in his native Cassel, aged 59.

VANDAMME is one of the names inscribed under the Arc de Triomphe.
