= Army of the Danube =

Field army

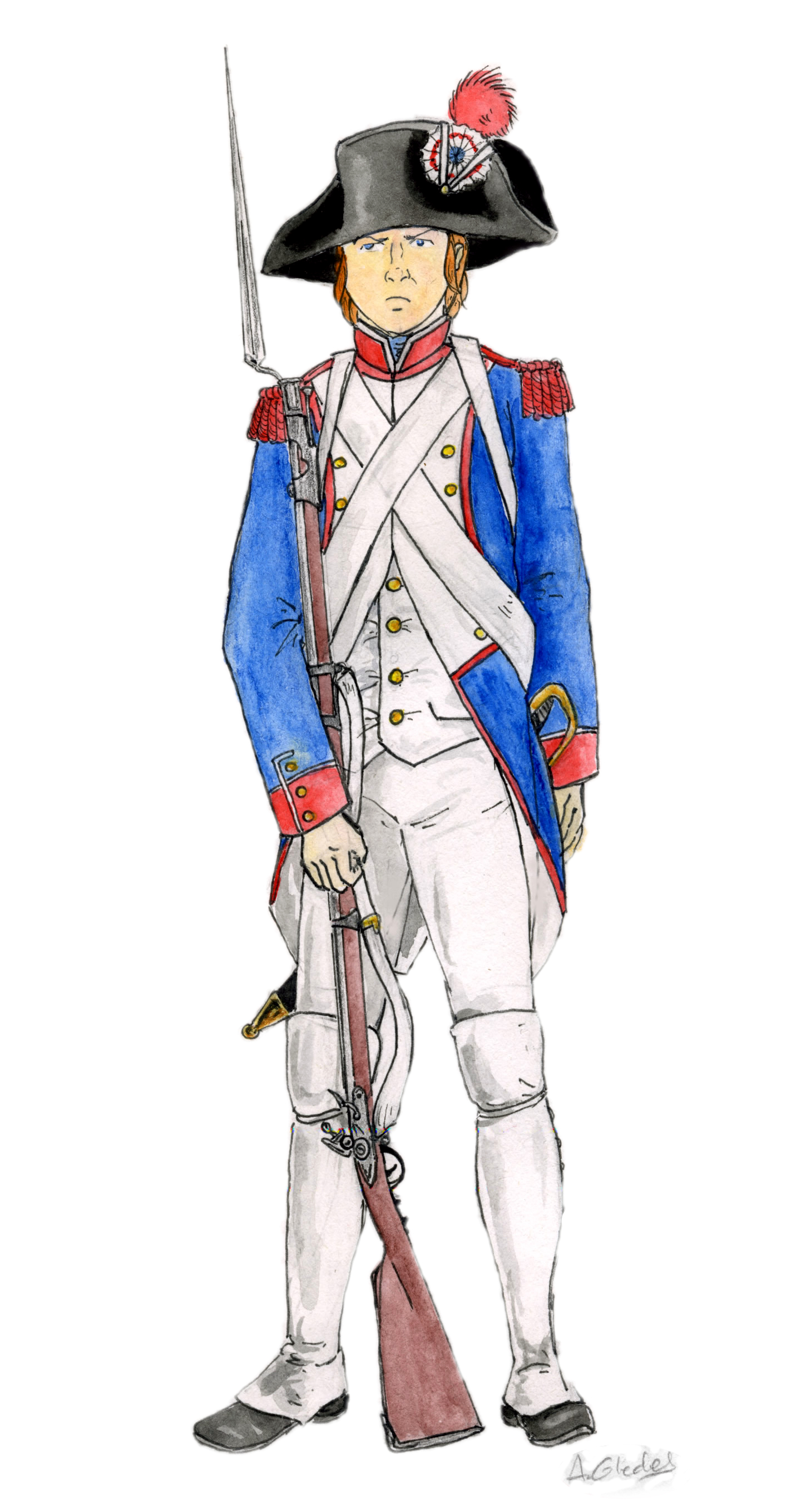
- Fusilier of a French Revolutionary Army
- Active: 2 March – 11 December 1799
- Disbanded: 24 November 1799 and units merged into Army of the Rhine
- Country: (French First Republic) First Republic
- Engagements: Battle of Ostrach; Battle of Stockach (1799); Battle of Winterthur (1799); First Battle of Zurich; Second Battle of Zurich

Commanders
- Notable commanders: Jean-Baptiste Jourdan; André Masséna; Louis Marie Turreau

The Army of the Danube (French: Armée du Danube) was a field army of the French Directory in the 1799 southwestern campaign in the Upper Danube valley. It was formed on 2 March 1799 by the simple expedient of renaming the Army of Observation, which had been observing Austrian movements on the border between French First Republic and the Holy Roman Empire. It was commanded by General Jean-Baptiste Jourdan, 1st Comte Jourdan (1762–1833).

The formation of the army was part of the French Directory's long term strategy to undermine Habsburg influence in the Holy Roman Empire, and, conversely, to strengthen French hegemony in central Europe after the wars of the First Coalition and the Treaty of Campo Formio in 1797. Despite the Treaty, Austria and France remained suspicious of each other's motives, and the purpose of the Army of the Observation was to watch for Austrian border transgressions. Understanding that the negotiations at the Congress of Rastatt were going no-where, the Army of Observation was instructed to cross the Rhine. Once across the Rhine, the Army of the Danube, was to secure strategic positions in southwestern Germany (present day Baden-Württemberg) and engage Archduke Charles' Habsburg army. In the meantime, the Army of Helvetia, under command of André Masséna, would secure such strategic locations as St. Gotthard Pass, the Swiss Plateau, and upper Rhine basin.

The army participated in four battles. In the battles of Ostrach and first Stockach, the Army of the Danube withdrew after suffering heavy losses. After reorganization, in which elements of the army were combined with Massena's Army of Switzerland, it withdrew after an engagement with Charles' superior force at Zürich in early June 1799; only in the Second Battle of Zurich did the Army of the Danube secure an uncontested victory. In December 1799, the Army of the Danube merged with the Army of the Rhine.

== Background ==
Initially, such rulers of Europe as Joseph II, Holy Roman Emperor viewed the revolution in France as an event between the French king and his subjects, and not something in which they should interfere. As the rhetoric grew more strident, the monarchies started to view events with distrust. Leopold, who had succeeded Joseph as Emperor in 1791, saw the situation surrounding his sister, Marie Antoinette, and her children, with greater and greater alarm. As the revolution grew more and more radical, he still sought to avoid war, but in the late summer, he, in consultation with French émigré nobles and Frederick William II of Prussia, issued the Declaration of Pillnitz, in which they declared the interest of the monarchs of Europe as one with the interests of Louis and his family. They threatened vague, but serious, consequences if anything should happen to the royal family.

By 1792, the French republican position had become increasingly difficult. Compounding internal economic and social problems, French émigrés agitated abroad for support of a counter-revolution that would restore an absolute monarchy. Chief among them were Louis Joseph, Prince of Condé (cousin of Louis XVI), Condé's son, Louis Henri, Duke of Bourbon, and Condé's grandson, Louis Antoine, Duke of Enghien. From their base in Koblenz, immediately over the French border, they sought direct support for military intervention from the royal houses of Europe, and themselves raised a small army. The ascension of young and uncompromising Francis as Holy Roman Emperor-elect on the death of his father in July 1792 also contributed to their unease.

On 20 April 1792, the French National Convention declared war on Austria. In this War of the First Coalition (1792–98), France ranged itself against most of the European states sharing land or water borders with her, plus Portugal and the Ottoman Empire. Although the Coalition forces achieved several victories at Verdun, Kaiserslautern, Neerwinden, Mainz, Amberg and Würzburg, the efforts of Napoleon Bonaparte in northern Italy pushed Austrian forces across the Italian-Austrian border and resulted in the negotiation of the Peace of Leoben (17 April 1797) and the subsequent Treaty of Campo Formio (October 1797).

From October 1797 until the Army of the Danube crossed into Germany in March 1799, the signatories of the Treaty of Campo Formio had avoided armed conflict. Despite their agreement at Campo Formio, the two primary combatants, France and Austria, remained suspicious of each other's motives. Several diplomatic incidents undermined the agreement. The French demanded additional territory not mentioned in the Treaty. The Habsburgs were reluctance to hand over designated territories, much less additional ones. The Congress at Rastatt proved inept at orchestrating the transfer of territories to compensate the German princes for their losses. Ferdinand of Naples refused to pay tribute to France, followed by a general Neapolitan rebellion, the French suppression, and the subsequent establishment of the Parthenopean Republic. Republicans in the Swiss cantons, supported by the French army, overthrew the central government in Bern and established the Helvetic Republic.

Other factors contributed to the rising tensions. On his way to Egypt, Napoleon had stopped on Malta and forcibly removed the Hospitallers from their possessions, angering Paul, Tsar of Russia, who was the honorary head of the Order. The French Directory, furthermore, was convinced that the Austrians were conniving to start another war. Indeed, the weaker the French Republic seemed, the more seriously the Austrians, the Neapolitans, the Russians and the English actually discussed this possibility.

== Purpose and formation ==
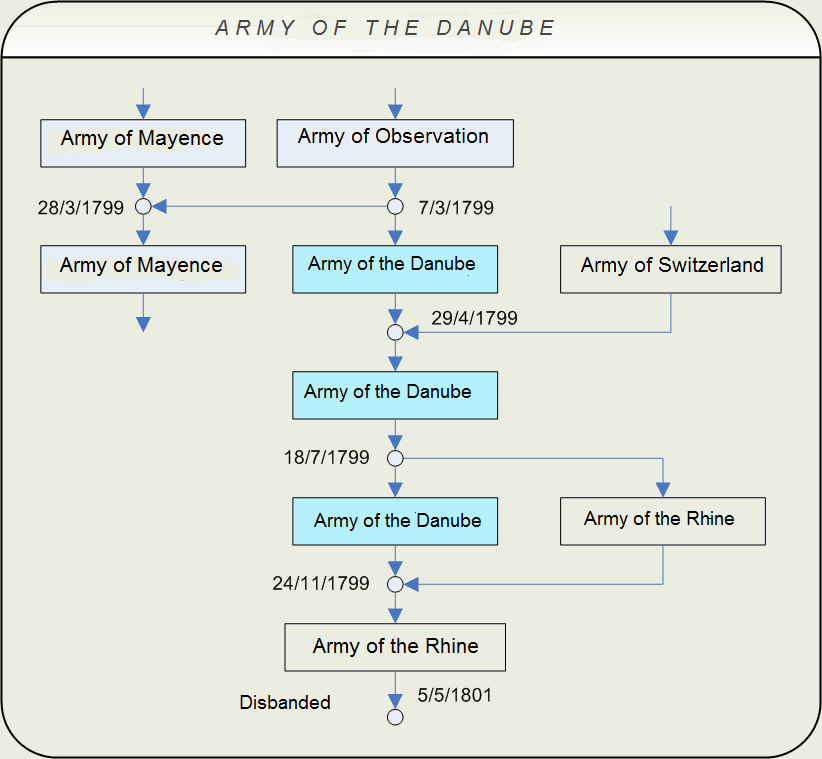
Evolution of the Army of the Danube

Military planners in Paris understood that the northern Rhine Valley, the south-western German territories, and Switzerland were strategically important for the defense of the Republic. The Swiss passes commanded access to northern Italy; consequently, the army that held those passes could move troops to and from northern and southern theaters quickly. The river was a formidable barrier to what the French perceived as Austrian aggression, and the state that controlled its crossings controlled the river itself. Finally, control of the Upper Danube would allow France to move its troops from Italy to the North Sea, or any point in between, offering immense strategic value.

Toward this end, in the early November 1798, Jourdan arrived in Hüningen, near the Swiss city of Basel, to take command of the Army of Observation, so-called because its function was to observe the security of the French border on the Rhine. Once there, Jourdan assessed the quality and disposition of the forces and identified needed supplies and manpower. He found the army woefully inadequate for its assignment. The Army, and its flanking armies, the Army of Helvetia (Switzerland) and the Army of Mayence, were equally short of manpower, supplies, ammunition, and training. Jourdan documented assiduously these shortages, pointing out in lengthy correspondence to the Directory the consequences of an under-manned and under-supplied army; his petitions seemed to have little effect on the Directory, which sent neither significant additional manpower nor supplies.

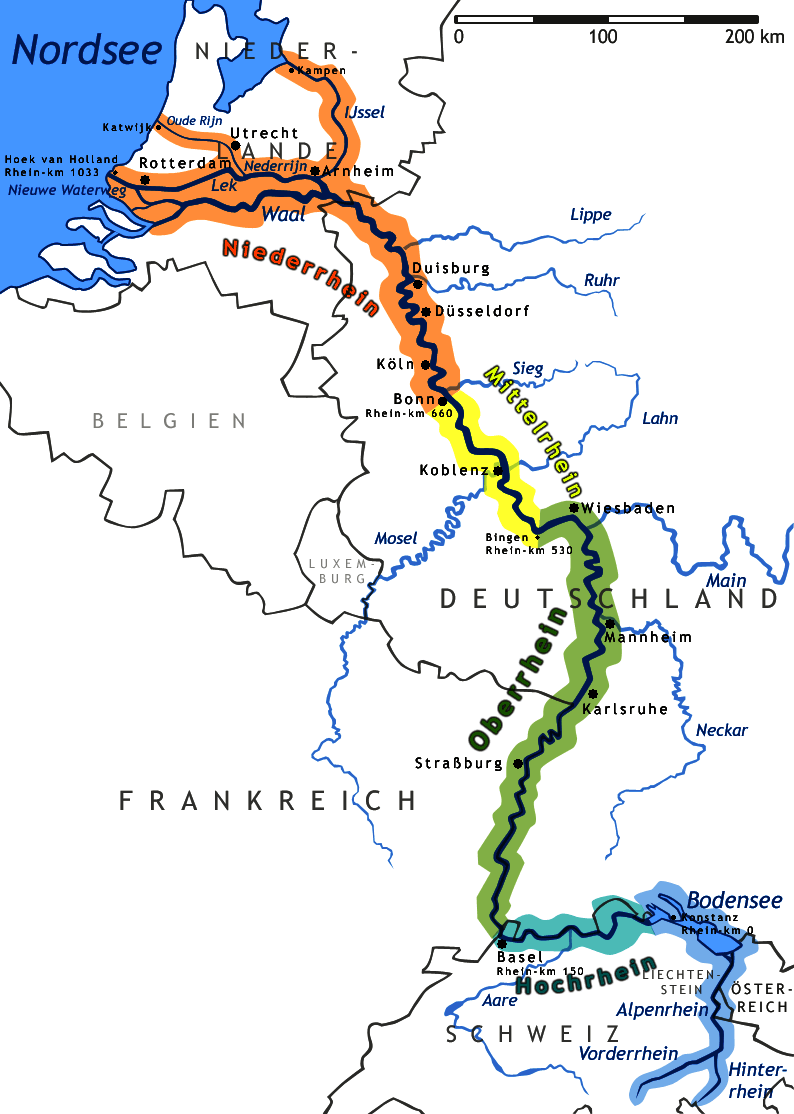
Once the Army of the Danube crossed the Rhine at Kehl and Huningen, most of its action centered around the Rhine's east-west shores

Jourdan's orders were to take the army into Germany and secure strategic positions, particularly on the roads through Stockach and Schaffhausen, at the westernmost border of Lake Constance. Similarly, as commander of the Army of Helvetia, André Masséna would acquire strategic positions in Switzerland, in particular the St. Gotthard Pass, the passes above Feldkirch, particularly Maienfeld (St. Luciensteig), and hold the central plateau in and around Zürich and Winterthur. These positions would prevent the Allies of the Second Coalition from moving troops back and forth between the northern Italian and German theaters, and insure French access to these strategic passes. Ultimately, this positioning would allow the French to control all western roads leading to and from Vienna. Finally, to complete Vienna's isolation, the army of Mayence would sweep through the north, blocking further access to and from Vienna from any of the northern Provinces, or from Britain.

== Crossing the Rhine ==
On March 1, 1799, the Army of Observation, in an order of battle of approximately 30,000 men in four divisions, crossed the Rhine at Kehl and Basel as units crossed, they took the name Army of the Danube.

The French (red) and Habsburg (yellow) armies converged on Ostrach in March 1799.

- Advance Guard, with approximately 9,000 men under General François Joseph Lefebvre, and temporarily commanded by Dominique Vandamme. This also included the detached left flank of 3,000 Vandamme eventually used to take Stuttgart.
- I. Division, with approximately 8,000 men under General Pierre Marie Barthélemy Ferino.
- II. Division, with approximately 7,000 men under General Joseph Souham.
- III. Division, approximately 7,000 men under Laurent Saint-Cyr constituted the left flank.
- Reserve, with approximately 3,000 men under Jean-Joseph Ange d'Hautpoul.

The army advanced in four columns. First Division, the right wing, assembled at Hüningen, crossed at Basel and advanced eastward along the north shore of the Rhine toward Lake Constance. The Advanced Guard crossed at Kehl, and Vandamme led it north-east through the mountains via Freudenstadt. This column eventually became the left flank. It was followed across the Rhine, also at Kehl, by the II. Division. The Third Division and the Reserve also crossed at Kehl, and then divided into two columns, III. Division traveling through the Black Forest via Oberkirch, and the Reserve, with most of the artillery and horse, further south via the valley at Freiburg im Breisgau, where they would find more forage, and then over the mountains past the Titisee to Löffingen and Hüfingen.

Although Jourdan could have established a position on the immediate eastern slope of the mountains—and indeed he might have been better advised to do so—he pushed eastward across the Danube plain, taking a temporary position between Rottweil and Tuttlingen. Eventually he directed the army to establish a line centered in Pfullendorf. He planned to engage the Habsburg army under the Habsburg commander-in-chief Archduke Charles on the Ostrach plateau.

While this may have seemed like a good plan, Jourdan's choice of ground created problems for him later. The plain below Pfullendorf was riddled with such streams and brooks as the Ostrach, a Danube tributary, which drained out of the marshes and swamps of Pfrungenried; in the spring of most years, this was not the best choice of ground. Although from Pfullendorf and the more moderate heights to the north of the village of Ostrach, Jourdan could establish reasonable artillery positions, the softness of the marshland itself would diminish the impact of a cannonade on the Austrian line. The marsh was also prone to fogginess, which would hinder visual planning and tactics. Furthermore, the softness of the ground would make the use of cavalry difficult, and cavalry maneuvers would be made more difficult by the likelihood of fog. Finally, the major part of Charles' army had wintered immediately east of the Lech, which Jourdan knew, because he had sent agents into Germany with instructions to identify the location and strength of his enemy. This was less than 64 kilometers (40 mi) distant; any passage over the Lech was facilitated by available bridges, both of permanent construction and temporary pontoons and a traverse through friendly territory.

== Engagements ==
Battles of the Army of the Danube

In March 1799, the Army of the Danube engaged in two major battles, both in the southwestern German theater. At the Battle of Ostrach, 20–22 March 1799, the first battle of the War of the Second Coalition, Austrian forces, under the command of Archduke Charles, defeated French forces. The French suffered significant losses and were forced to retreat from the region, taking up new positions at Messkirch (also spelled Mößkirch or Meßkirch), and then at Stockach and Engen. At the second battle, in Stockach, on 25 March 1799, the Habsburg army achieved a decisive victory over the French forces, and again pushed the French army west. Jourdan instructed his generals to take up positions in the Black Forest, and he himself established a base at Hornberg. From there, General Jourdan relegated command of the army to his chief of staff, Jean Augustin Ernouf, and traveled to Paris to ask for more and better troops and, ultimately, when these were not forthcoming, to request a medical leave. The Army was reorganized, and a portion placed under the command of André Masséna and merged with the Army of Helvetia. Following the reorganization and change in command, the Army participated in the Battle of Winterthur and the First Battle of Zürich and, three months later, the Second Battle of Zürich.

=== Battle of Ostrach ===
Battle of Ostrach
Date	20–23 March 1799
Location	Ostrach, Salem Abbey (Germany)
Result	French retreat

Belligerents
First Republic	Habsburg monarchy

Commanders and leaders
Jean-Baptiste Jourdan	Archduke Charles

Strength
18,000	52,000

Casualties and losses
2,257 (12.5%)	2,113 (4%)

The Battle of Ostrach, also called the Battle by Ostrach, occurred 20–23 March 1799. In early March, the Army of the Danube pressed forward toward Pfullendorf and Ostrach, the former an imperial city in Upper Swabia and the latter a nearby village of 300 belonging to the Imperial Abbey of Salem. Their goal was to cut the Austrian line at Switzerland, preventing the Coalition use of Switzerland as an overland route between central and southern Europe. This would ostensibly isolate the armies of the Coalition in northern Italy and Germany, and prevent them from assisting one another; furthermore, if the French held the interior passes in Switzerland, they could use the routes to move their own forces between the two theaters.

The battle occurred during Holy Week in 1799, amid rain and dense fog, on the marsh southeast of the village. Initially, on 20 March, the French were able to take, and hold, the village of Ostrach and the nearby hamlet of Hoßkirch. On the morning of 21 March, as General Jourdan later wrote, as the Habsburg army attacked, his men seemed to disappear in a cloud of redcoats, which referred to the Habsburg Hussar and Grenadier uniforms. That evening, after more than 15 hours in general engagement, the Austrians flanked his left wing, and Saint Cyr's force was pressed back to the Pfullendorf heights. In the early morning, as the fog lifted, Jourdan could see the Archduke's formidable force arrayed on the plains below him. The archduke's arrangements made it clear that Jourdan could not keep the heights of Pfullendorf. As he withdrew, a portion of his right flank was cut off from the main force.

Although casualties appeared even in numbers for both sides, the Austrians fielded a significantly larger fighting force of nearly 55,000 at Ostrach, with another 60,000 stretched along a line between Lake Constance and Ulm. French casualties amounted to more than 12 percent of their force, and Austrian, approximately four percent. The French were forced back to Stockach, where on 25 March the armies engaged again, this time with greater losses on both sides, and a decisive Austrian victory.

=== Battle of Stockach ===
Battle of Stockach (1799)
Date	25 March 1799
Location	Stockach, present-day Germany
Result	Austrian victory and French withdrawal from region.

Belligerents
First Republic	Habsburg monarchy

Commanders and leaders
Jean-Baptiste Jourdan	Archduke Charles

Strength
40,000 soldiers	80,000 soldiers

Casualties and losses
400 killed, 1600 wounded, 2,000 captured, 1 gun lost.	500 killed, 2400 wounded, 2,900 captured, 2 guns lost.

At the Battle of Stockach, Jean-Baptiste Jourdan and Archduke Charles again directed the French force of 40,000 and the Habsburg force of 80,000, respectively. While attempting to rally his troops, Jourdan was dismounted, nearly trampled to death by his soldiers, and barely escaped capture by the Austrians. Charles' personal intervention was crucial for the Austrians, and he was in the thick of the fighting, buying time for reinforcements to arrive. The French were defeated and driven back upon the Rhine.

The general engagement was brutal and bloody. Before daybreak on 25 March, the French left wing launched a headlong attack on the Austrian right wing, coordinated with assaults on the Austrian left. The ferocious attack forced the Austrians out of the woods in which they had been positioned overnight, and pushed them to the village of Schwanndorf. Fearing that his forces would shortly be flanked, Charles directed reinforcements to back up the right wing. The Archduke himself led eight battalions of Hungarian grenadiers into the fight, and during this part of the action, both the Prince of Anhalt and Karl Aloys zu Fürstenberg were killed by French case shot. The main French assault on the Austrian center was stalled by the superior numbers.

On the French right flank, General Ferino attempted to push the Austrians back, first with a cannonade, followed by an attack through the woods on both sides of the road between the hamlet of Asch and Stockach. A third charge succeeded in taking the road, but the Habsburg forces reformed the line and the artillery, now at the head of a wedge, bombarded the French troops. In a bayonet charge, the French took the hamlet of Wahlweiss, but Ferino's troops could not hold it and withdrew during the night. Jourdan then ordered a general withdrawal from the region, instructing his divisions to retreat along the lines of march they had followed into the region, and himself establishing a command post at Hornberg. He sent the cavalry to the western side of the Black Forest, where the horses could expect to find better forage.

=== Battle of Winterthur ===
By mid-May, 1799, the Austrians had wrested control of the eastern portions of the newly formed Helvetic Republic from the French as the forces of Hotze and pushed them out of the Grisons. Archduke Charles' own sizable force—about 110,000 strong—crossed the Rhine west of Schaffhausen, and prepared to join with the armies of Friedrich, Baron von Hotze and Friedrich Joseph, Count of Nauendorf on the Swiss Plateau by Zürich. The French Army of Helvetia and the Army of the Danube, now both under the command of André Masséna, tried to prevent this merger of the Habsburr forces at the Winterthur crossroads.

Battle of Winterthur, near Zürich Switzerland
Date	27 May 1799
Location	Winterthur, Switzerland
Result	Austrian victory

Belligerents
First Republic	Habsburg Monarchy

Commanders and leaders
Michel Ney, Commanding elements of the Army of the Danube	Friedrich Freiherr von Hotze; Friedrich Joseph, Count of Nauendorf

Strength
7,000	8,000

Casualties and losses
800 men killed, wounded or missing, four guns.	1,000 killed, wounded or missing.

Masséna sent the newly promoted General of Division Michel Ney and part of the Army of the Danube to Winterthur on 27 May 1799 to stop the Austrian advance from eastern Switzerland. If the Austrians succeeded in uniting Hotze's army from the east with Nauendorf's directly north of Zurich, and Archduke Charles' which lay to the north and west, the French would be half encircled at Zurich and dangerously exposed.

On the morning of 27 May, Friedrich Freiherr von Hotze assembled his force into three columns and marched toward Winterthur. Opposite him, Michel Ney deployed his force around the heights, the so-called Ober-Winterthur, a ring of low-lying hills some 6 kilometers (4 mi) north of the city. The overall commander of the forward line, Jean Victor Tharreau, had informed Ney that he would send Jean-de-Dieu Soult's division to support him; Ney understood this to mean he was to make a stand along the entire outpost line, and that he would not be isolated. His small force would receive reinforcements from Soult's division. Consequently, Ney directed the weakest brigade, under the command of Gazan, to move up a long valley toward Frauenfeld, and another brigade, under the command of Roget, to take the right, preventing any Austrian flanking maneuver.

By mid-morning, Hotze's advanced guard had encountered moderate French resistance first from the two brigades Ney had at his disposal. The Austrian advance troops quickly overran the weaker brigade and took possession of the woods surrounding the village of Islikon. After securing the villages of Gundeschwil, Schottikon, Wiesendangen, and Stogen, further west of Islikon, Hotze deployed two of his columns facing the French front, while a third angled to the French right, as Ney had expected he would. Soult never appeared (he was later court martialed for insubordination), and Ney withdrew his forces through Winterthur, regrouping with Tharreau's main force in the outskirts of Zurich. A day later, Hotze's force united with the main Habsburg force of Archduke Charles.

=== First Battle of Zürich ===
First Battle of Zürich
Date	4–7 June 1799
Location	Zürich, Switzerland
Result	Austrian victory

Belligerents
First Republic	Habsburg Monarchy

Commanders and leaders
André Masséna	Archduke Charles of Austria

Strength
30,000	40,000

Casualties and losses
1,700	3,500

In the First Battle of Zürich, on 4–7 June 1799, approximately 45,000 French and 53,000 Austrians clashed on the plains around the city. On the left wing, Hotze had 20 battalions of infantry, plus support artillery, and 27 squadrons of cavalry, in total, 19,000 men. On the right wing, General Friedrich Joseph, Count of Nauendorf commanded another 18,000. The battle cost both sides dearly; General of Brigade Cherin was killed, on the French side, and on the Austrian side, Feldzeugmeister (General of Infantry) Olivier, Count of Wallis, was killed. On the French side, 500 died, 800 were wounded and 300 captured; on the Austrian side, 730 killed, 1,470 wounded, and 2,200 captured. When the Austrians took the French positions in the city, they also captured over 150 guns. Ultimately, French general André Masséna yielded the city to the Austrians, under Archduke Charles. Massena retreated beyond the Limmat, where he managed to fortify his positions. Hotze's force harassed their retreat, and secured the river shoreline. Despite Hotze's aggressive harassment of the French retreat, Charles did not follow up on the withdrawal; Masséna established himself on the opposite bank of the Limmat without threat of pursuit from the main body of the Habsburg Army, much to the annoyance of the Russian liaison officer, Alexander Ivanovich, Count Ostermann-Tolstoy.

On 14 August 1799, a Russian force of 6,000 cavalry, 20,000 infantry, and 1,600 Cossacks, under Alexander Korsakov, joined Archduke Charles' force in Schaffhausen. In a vice-like operation, together with the Russians, they would surround André Masséna's smaller army on the banks of the Limmat, where it had taken refuge the previous spring. To divert this attack, General Claude Lecourbe attacked the pontoon bridges over which the Austrians crossed the Rhine, destroying most of them, and making the rest unusable.

Before Charles could regroup, orders arrived from the Aulic Council, the imperial body in Vienna charged with conduct of war, to overset his plan; Charles' troops were to leave Zurich in the supposedly capable hands of Korsokov, re-cross the Rhine and march north to Mainz. Charles stalled this operation as long as he could, but eventually he had to concede to Vienna's orders. Consequently, the Russian troops under a novice general replaced the Austrian troops and their seasoned commander in the strategically important city. Charles withdrew his force to the north of the Rhine and marched slowly toward Mainz. In Italy, the Russian generalissimo, Alexander Suvorov, was horrified when he heard this: he depended upon a stable Austro-Russian presence in Switzerland to protect his flank and he expected to join this army by September or October at the latest. Although the order to Charles to recross the Rhine and march north was eventually countermanded, by the time such instructions reached him, he had gone too far to return to Zurich in time.

=== Second Battle of Zürich ===
Second Battle of Zürich
Date	25–26 September 1799
Location	Zürich, Switzerland
Result	French victory

Belligerents
First Republic	Habsburg Monarchy; Russia

Commanders and leaders
André Masséna	Alexander Korsakov; Friedrich von Hotze †

Strength
75,000	24,000 Russians; 22,000 Austrians

Casualties and losses
Unknown	22,000

In the Second Battle of Zürich, the French regained control of the city, along with the rest of Switzerland. Notably, Masséna out-generaled Korsakov; surrounded him, tricked him, and then took more than half his army as a prisoner. Massena also captured the baggage train and most of Korsakov cannons, and inflicted over 8,000 casualties. Most of the fighting took place on both banks of the river Limmat, up to the gates of Zürich, and in part within the city itself. Zürich had declared itself neutral, and was spared general destruction. General Oudinot commanded the French forces on the right bank and general Joseph Mortier, those on the left.

At the same time, Soult led a small force, some 150 musket-men, across the river Linth—the men held their muskets over their heads and waded across, through water to their chests—and protected the crossing site for the remainder of the force. Baron von Hotze, commander of the Habsburg force there, advanced on the position near Richterswil to direct its defense, and was killed by a French musket ball. His successor, Franz Petrasch, could not push the French back, and organized a retreat from the region, falling back to St. Gallen and losing another 8,000 men and some guns. By the time Suvorov arrived in St. Gallen in early October, the Austrians and the Russians had been pushed out and he was forced to lead his men over the Alps to the Vorarlberg, resulting in additional losses.

== Organizational and command problems ==
The French army experienced a variety of command problems, especially in its early operations in southwestern Germany. After the defeat at Stockach, the army withdrew into the Black Forest. Jourdan relinquished command provisionally to Ernouf, who was a capable staff officer but had insufficient experience to hold together a varied and demoralized force. Jourdan retired to Strasbourg, where he was, or claimed he was, indisposed. By the time Masséna arrived to take command, organization and discipline was in shambles. Only four divisional generals had remained at their posts: Klein, Ferino, Souham, and Vandamme. Decaen was under arrest in Strasbourg, pending a Courts-martial, as was d'Hautpoul, for his failure to organize a timely cavalry attack at Stockach. The others had disappeared to different parts of the southwest or had gone to France. No one knew where Bernadotte had gone, and Saint Cyr had retired to Mannheim. The latter was at least reachable. Lecourbe, who had been injured at Stockach, had withdrawn to Paris to recover; in a strategically astute move, he remained there until late November, when he was able to offer Napoleon direct assistance in his coup, and thus acquired Bonaparte's attention and gratitude.

=== School for marshals ===
Initially, the Army included five future Marshals of France: Jean-Baptiste Jourdan, its commander-in-chief, François Joseph Lefebvre, Jean-Baptiste Drouet, Laurent de Gouvion Saint-Cyr, and Édouard Adolphe Casimir Joseph Mortier. After the defeat at Ostrach, the Army was reorganized and command shifted to another future marshal, André Masséna.

== Subsequent variations ==
The Army of Switzerland and portions of the Army of the Danube merged in a joint command under André Masséna in April 1799; in June, portions of the Army of the Danube were used to strengthen the Army of the Rhine. Both the Army of the Rhine and the Army of the Danube subsequently merged in 24 November 1799 to form a new, enlarged army designated the Army of the Rhine.

== Commanders ==
Image	Name	Dates	Battles/Campaigns
Formal half portrait of Jourdan in dress military uniform, wearing a dark coat with white lapels, a red shoulder sash and gold waist sash. He has golden epaulets on his shoulders. He is an older man with gray hair pulled into a pony-tail, a fair face and a long nose.	Jean-Baptiste Jourdan	7 March – 8 April 1799	Battle of Ostrach; Battle of Stockach (1799)
Formal portrait of Ernouf in dress military uniform, wearing a dark coat with shoulder epaulets, a white shirt with a high collar. He has light curly hair and a round face.	Jean Augustin Ernouf	8 April 1799 – 29 April 1799	temporary command
Formal full-length portrait of Masséna in dress military uniform, comprising white breeches with knee length black boots, dark cutaway coat with high collar and gold embroidery, a red shoulder sash and gold waist sash. He wears a large star of honor on his breast. He is a tall dark man with a long face and thick eyebrows. He looks quizzically at the observer and holds a marshal's baton, and saber.	André Masséna	29 April – 29 November 1799	First Battle of Zurich; Second Battle of Zurich
Formal full-length portrait of Turreau mounted on his white horse and leading his troops into battle. He is wearing dress military uniform, comprising white breeches with knee length black boots, dark cutaway coat with high collar and gold embroidery and a red waist sash. He points a marshal's baton..	Louis Marie Turreau	30 November – 11 December 1799	Provisional Commander, appointed briefly after the November coup d'etat

== Sources ==
=== Bibliography ===
- Alison, Archibald. A History of Europe from the Commencement of the French Revolution in 1789 to the Restoration of the Bourbons, New York: A.S. Barnes, 1850.
- Atteridge, Andrew Hilliarde. The bravest of the brave, Michel Ney: marshal of France, duke of Elchingen. New York: Brentano, 1913.
- Blanning, Timothy. The French Revolutionary Wars. New York: Oxford University Press, 1996. ISBN 0-340-56911-5
- (in German) Broda, Ruth. "Schlacht von Ostrach:" jährt sich zum 210. Mal – Feier am Wochenende. Wie ein Dorf zum Kriegsschauplatz wurde. In: Südkurier vom 13. Mai 2009.
- Clausewitz, Carl von (2020). Napoleon Absent, Coalition Ascendant: The 1799 Campaign in Italy and Switzerland, Volume 1. Trans and ed. Nicholas Murray and Christopher Pringle. Lawrence, Kansas: University Press of Kansas. ISBN 978-0-7006-3025-7
- Clausewitz, Carl von (2021). The Coalition Crumbles, Napoleon Returns: The 1799 Campaign in Italy and Switzerland, Volume 2. Trans and ed. Nicholas Murray and Christopher Pringle. Lawrence, Kansas: University Press of Kansas. ISBN 978-0-7006-3034-9
- "Engagements Between The Grand Armies Of The Archduke and General Jourdan." The Times (London), Friday, 5 April 1799; p. 2; col A.
- Gallagher, John. Napoleon's enfant terrible: General Dominique Vandamme, Tulsa: University of Oklahoma Press, 2008. ISBN 978-0-8061-3875-6
- Hug, Lina and Richard Stead. Switzerland. New York, G.P. Putnam's Sons, 1902.
- (in German) Hürlimann, Katja. (Johann Konrad) "Friedrich von Hotze" in Historisches Lexikon der Schweiz. 15 January 2008 edition, accessed 18 October 2009.
- Jourdan, Jean-Baptiste. A Memoir of the Operations of the Army of the Danube under the Command of General Jourdan, Taken from the Manuscripts of that Officer. London: Debrett, 1799.
- Kessinger, Roland. "Order of Battle, Army of the Danube". Accessed 15 November 2009.
- Longworth, Philip. The Art of Victory: the Life and Achievements of Generalissimo Suvarov, London: np, 1965,
- Phipps, Ramsey Weston. The Armies of the First French Republic, volume 5: "The armies of the Rhine in Switzerland, Holland, Italy, Egypt and the coup d'etat of Brumaire, 1797–1799," Oxford: Oxford University Press, 1939.
- Rothenberg, Gunther E. Napoleon’s great adversaries: Archduke Charles and the Austrian Army 1792–1914, Stroud, (Gloucester): Spellmount, 2007. ISBN 978-1-86227-383-2.
- Shadwell, Lawrence. Mountain warfare illustrated by the campaign of 1799 in Switzerland: being a translation of the Swiss narrative, compiled from the works of the Archduke Charles, Jomini, and other...London: Henry S. King, 1875.
- Thiers, Adolphe. The history of the French revolution, New York: Appleton, 1854, v. 4.
- Young, John, D.D. A History of the Commencement, Progress, and Termination of the Late War between Great Britain and France which continued from the first day of February 1793 to the first of October 1801. In two volumes. Edinburg: Turnbull, 1802, vol. 2.
