= First Battle of Zurich =

1799 Battle during the War of the Second Coalition

- Part of the War of the Second Coalition
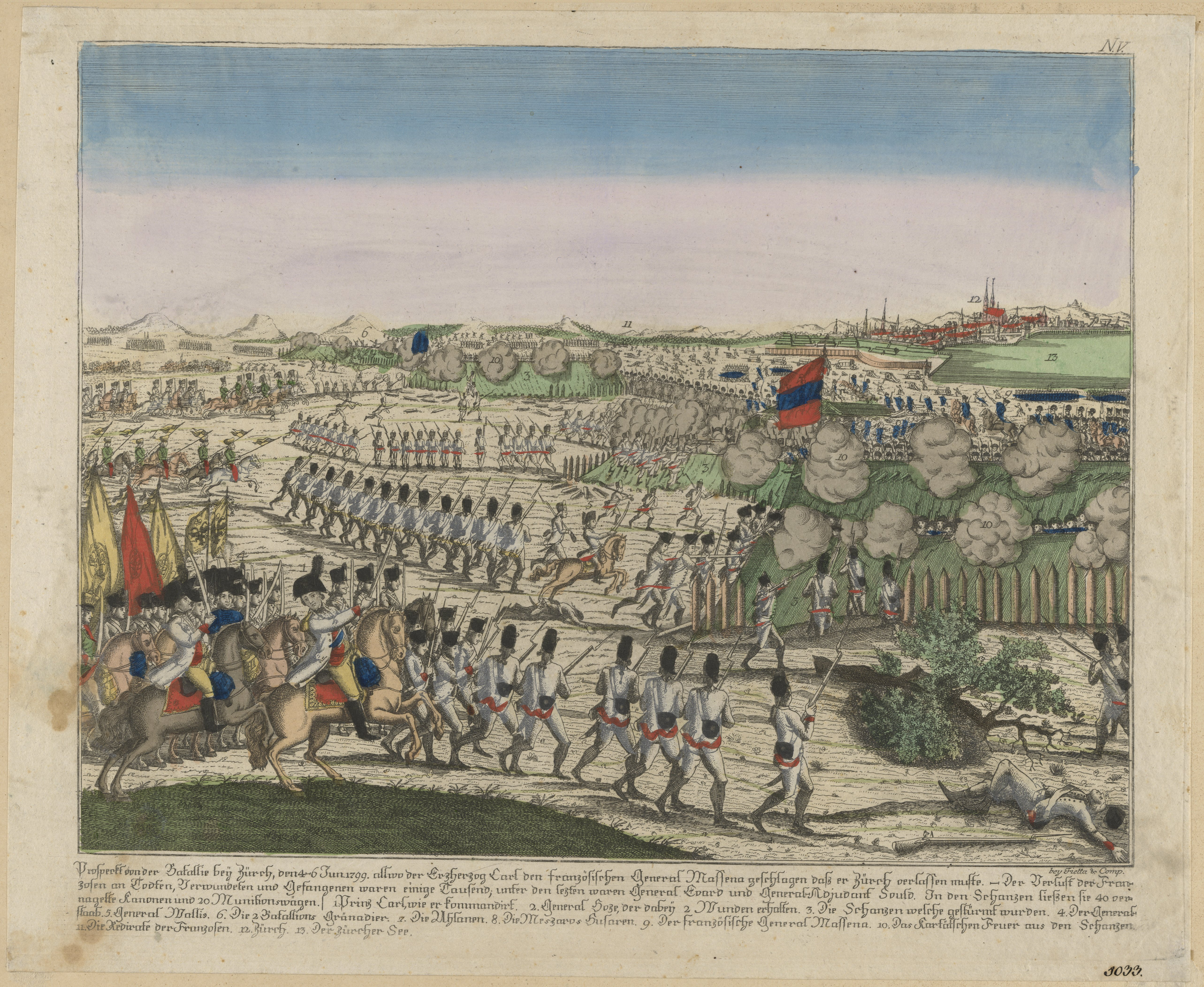
- Image from the First Battle of Zurich
Date	4 to 7 June 1799
Location	Zurich (Zürich), Switzerland 47°22′0″N 8°33′0″E
Result	Austrian victory (see § Aftermath)

Belligerents
France	(Holy Roman Empire) Austria

Commanders and leaders
André Masséna; Jean-de-Dieu Soult; Louis Chérin †; Nicolas Oudinot; Honoré Gazan; Jean Brunet	Archduke Charles of Austria; Friedrich Freiherr von Hotze; Heinrich XV; Olivier of Wallis †; Franjo Jelačić; Karl von Bey; Charles of Lorraine-Brionne

Strength
59,000 (in total)	72,000 (in total)

Casualties and losses
1,300–1,600: • 500 killed; • 800 wounded; • 300 captured; 28 guns captured 150 guns left in Zurich	3,400–4,400: • 730 killed; • 1,470 wounded; • 1,200–2,200 captured
- Location within Europe

War of the Second Coalition:
Austria
The color black indicates the current battle.

The First Battle of Zurich, from 4 to 7 June 1799, forced French General André Masséna to yield the city of Zurich to the Austrians, under Archduke Charles, and to retreat beyond the Limmat, where he managed to fortify his positions, which resulted in a stalemate.

The first battle of Zurich saw Austrian attacks on strong French positions, which were captured but then had to be abandoned due to a French counterattack. However, previously in this battle, the Austrians were able to press the French back from one foothold (Schwamendingen) and to repel a French counteroffensive near Zurich, while Austrian assaults on three French staging areas (Rapperswil, Hirslanden and Fällanden–Pfaffhausen) failed. Charles prepared to continue the battle, but Masséna did not decide to do it and retreated, leaving many of his guns behind (178 pieces) at the mercy of the Austrians.

The Helvetic Republic in 1798 became a battlefield of the French Revolutionary Wars. During the summer, Russian troops, under General Alexander Korsakov, replaced the Austrian troops, and at the Second Battle of Zurich, the French regained control of the city, along with the rest of Switzerland.

== Background ==
=== Political and diplomatic situation ===
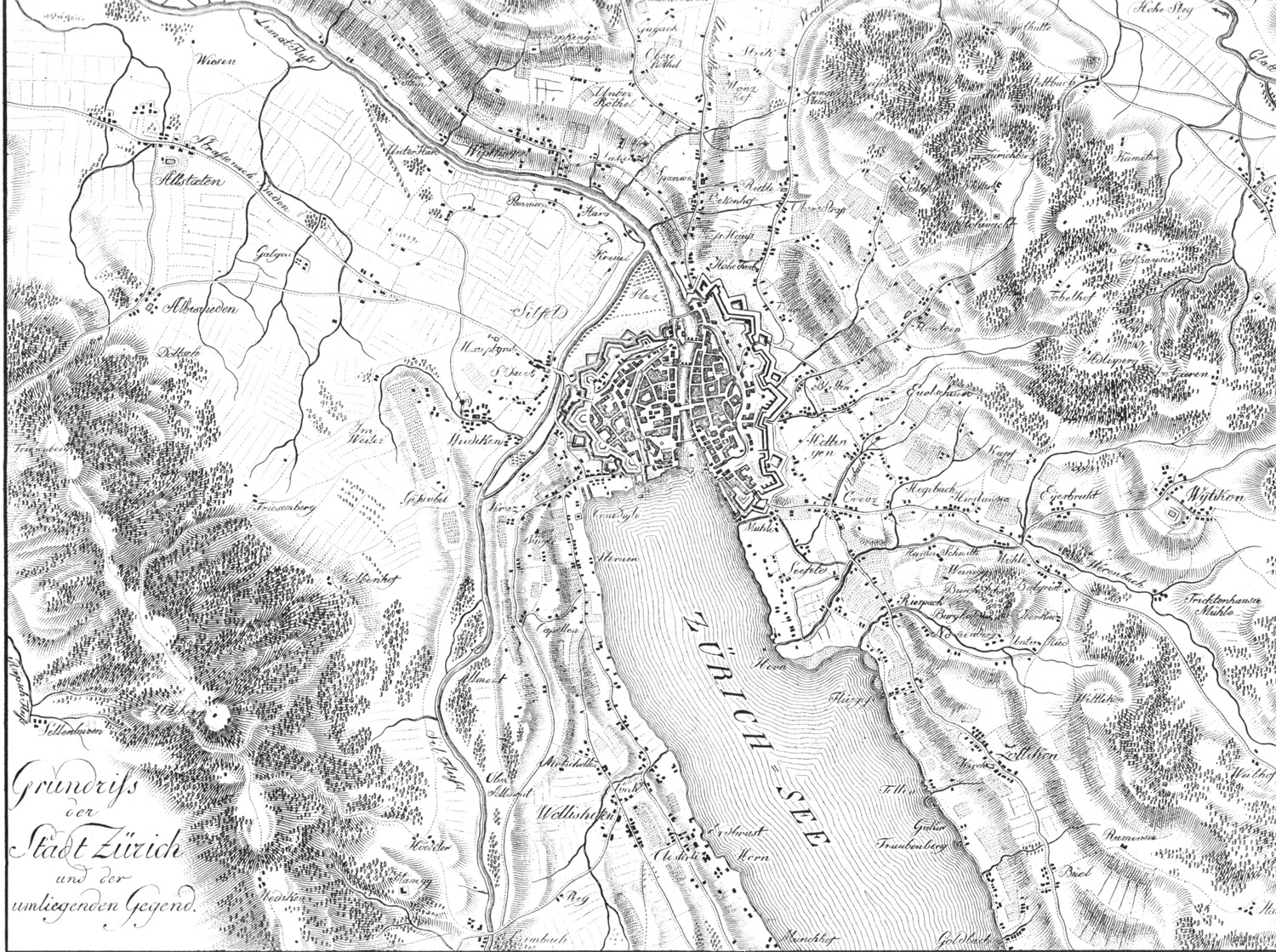
Map of Zürich, 1800

Initially, the rulers of Europe viewed the revolution in France as an event between the French king and his subjects, and not something in which they should interfere. As revolutionary rhetoric grew more strident, they declared the interest of the monarchs of Europe as one with the interests of Louis and his family; this Declaration of Pillnitz threatened ambiguous, but quite serious, consequences if anything should happen to the royal family. The French position became increasingly difficult. Compounding problems in international relations, French émigrés continued to agitate for support of a counter-revolution. On 20 April 1792, the French National Convention declared war on Austria. In this War of the First Coalition (1792–1798), France ranged itself against most of the European states sharing land or water borders with her, plus Portugal and the Ottoman Empire. Although the Coalition forces achieved several victories at Verdun, Kaiserslautern, Neerwinden, Mainz, Amberg and Würzburg, the efforts of Napoleon Bonaparte in northern Italy pushed Austrian forces back and resulted in the negotiation of the Peace of Leoben (17 April 1797) and the subsequent Treaty of Campo Formio (17 October 1797).

The treaty called for meetings between the involved parties to work out the exact territorial and remunerative details. Convened at a small town in the mid-Rhineland, Rastatt, the Congress quickly derailed in a mire of intrigue and diplomatic posturing. The French demanded more territory. The Austrians were reluctant to cede the designated territories. Compounding the Congress's problems, tensions grew between France and most of the First Coalition allies. Ferdinand of Naples refused to pay agreed-upon tribute to France, and his subjects followed this refusal with a rebellion. The French invaded Naples and established the Parthenopean Republic. Encouraged by the French Republic, a republican uprising in the Swiss cantons led to the overthrow of the Swiss Confederation and the establishment of the Helvetic Republic. The French Directory was convinced that the Austrians were planning to start another war. Indeed, the weaker France seemed, the more seriously the Austrians, the Neapolitans, the Russians, and the English discussed this possibility. In mid-spring, the Austrians reached an agreement with Tsar Paul of Russia by which the legendary Alexander Suvorov would come out of retirement to assist Austria in Italy with another 60,000 troops.

=== Outbreak of war in 1799 ===
The French Directory's military strategy in 1799 called for offensive campaigns on all fronts: central Italy, northern Italy, the Swiss cantons, the upper Rhineland, and Holland. Theoretically, the French had a combined force of 250,000 troops, but this was on paper, not in the field. As winter broke in 1799, General Jean-Baptiste Jourdan and the Army of the Danube, at a paper strength of 50,000 and an actual strength of 25,000, crossed the Upper Rhine between Basel and Kehl on 1 March. This crossing officially violated the Treaty of Campo Formio. The Army of the Danube advanced through the Black Forest and, by mid-March, established an offensive position between the Danube to the north and the High Rhine/Lake of Constance to the south by the village of Ostrach. André Masséna had already pushed into Switzerland with his force of 30,000, and successfully passed into the Grison Alps, Chur, and Finstermünz on the river Inn. Theoretically, his left flank was to link with Jourdan's right flank, commanded by Pierre Marie Barthélemy Ferino, at the far eastern shore of Lake Constance.

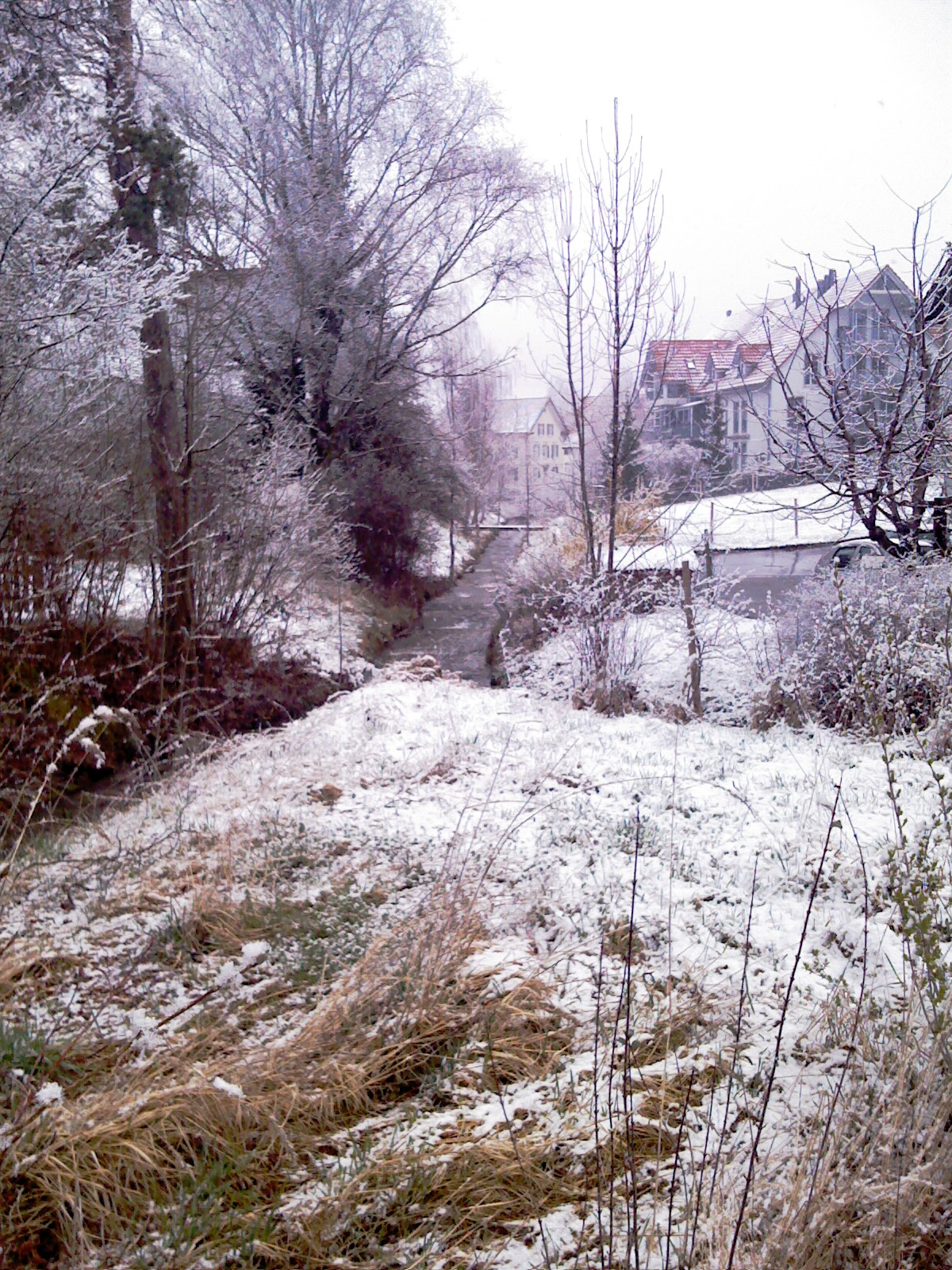
At Elgg, Hotze established his forward posts; although the winter snows had melted, the ground was still soggy and the streams were still in full spring flow.

The Austrians had arrayed their own army in a line from the Tyrol to the Danube. A force of 46,000 under command of Count Heinrich von Bellegarde formed the defence of the Tyrol. Another small Austrian force of 26,000 commanded by Friedrich Freiherr von Hotze guarded the Vorarlberg. The main Austrian Army—close to 80,000 troops under the command of Archduke Charles—had wintered in the Bavarian, Austrian, and Salzburg territories on the eastern side of the river Lech. At the battles of Ostrach (21 March) and Stockach (25 March), the main Austrian force pushed the Army of the Danube back into the Black Forest. Charles made plans to cross the High Rhine at the Swiss town of Schaffhausen. Friedrich Freiherr von Hotze brought a portion (approximately 8,000) of his force west, leaving the rest to defend the Vorarlberg. At the same time, Friedrich Joseph, Count of Nauendorf, brought the left wing of the main Austrian force across the High Rhine by Eglisau. They planned to unite with the main Austrian army, controlling the northern access points of Zürich and forcing an engagement with Masséna.

By mid-May, French morale was low. They had suffered terrible losses at Ostrach and Stockach, although these had been made up by reinforcements. Two senior officers of the Army of the Danube, Charles Mathieu Isidore Decaen and Jean-Joseph Ange d'Hautpoul, were facing courts-martial on charges of misconduct, proffered by their senior officer, Jourdan. Jean-Baptiste Bernadotte and Laurent de Gouvion Saint-Cyr were sick, or claimed they were, and had left the army's encampments to recover their health. Masséna's force had been repelled by Hotze's army at Feldkirch, and forced to fall back, and Lecourbe's failure to push through against Bellegarde's Austrian force in the Tyrol, meant Masséna had to pull his southern wing back as well as his center and northern wing, to maintain communication with the retreating armies on his flanks. At this point, also, the Swiss revolted again, this time against the French, and Zürich became the last defensible position Masséna could take.

=== Dispositions ===
After pushing the Army of the Danube out of the northern portion of the Swiss Plateau—the territory north of the High Rhine and south of the Danube—following the battles at Ostrach and Stockach, Archduke Charles' sizable force—about 110,000 strong—crossed the High Rhine west of Schaffhausen, and prepared to join with the Vorarlberg Corps of Friedrich, Baron von Hotze before Zürich. During the month of May André Masséna, now commander of both the French Army of Helvetia and the Army of the Danube began pulling back his forces to concentrate towards Zürich. Charles crossed the High Rhine at Stein with an advanced corps of 21 battalions and 13 squadrons under Nauendorf on 20 May, while two days later in the evening, Hotze crossed at Meiningen and Balzers with 18 battalions and 13 squadrons. On the 23rd the Archduke led 15 more battalions and 10 squadrons over the High Rhine at Büsingen.

Learning of the double-pronged advance, Masséna seized the opportunity to drive a wedge between the two Austrian commands and on 25 May launched attacks against Hotze's Corps to the east and Nauendorf's to the north. Hotze's advance troops under Petrasch were driven from Frauenfeld by Soult, while against the Archduke Michel Ney erupted from Winterthur, seized Andelfingen and threw back Nauendorf from Pfyn. Although the French were forced to withdraw on the appearance of Austrian reserves, nevertheless for a loss of 771 men they'd inflicted some 2,000 casualties and 3,000 prisoners on the Austrians.

On the 27th Ney was wounded and his men driven from Winterthur, Masséna thereafter concentrated his forces at Zürich, closely pressed by the Archduke Charles and Hotze.

By the end of the month the French were positioned: Soult's Division was on the Zürichberg overlooking the open country to the north from an entrenched camp constructed by Andréossi. To his left Oudinot's Division lay in support, with Gazan's brigade in the town of Zürich itself. Tharreau's Division continued the line across the Aare, with troops under Lorge' guarding the left of the High Rhine to Basel. To Soult's right Chabran guarded the south of Lake Zürich, with outposts stretched to link with the troops of Lecourbe' at Lucerne and the Alpine valley Urseren. In all some 52,000 French and Swiss troops. The entrenchments on the Zürichberg were in a 5-mile long semi-circle from Riesbach to Höngg, but were incomplete.

Charles decided to launch his main attack by the surest (though difficult) route, directly against the Zürichberg with his left and centre, holding his right wing back to protect his line of retreat.

== Jelačić's advance against Witikon ==
On 2 June, Archduke Charles became aware that Hotze's advance guard under Jelačić was advancing up against the main French positions near Witikon, and sent a message ordering him not to attack until all his other troops were ready; however, from 3:00 am on the 3rd, Jelačić was already engaged against Humbert's brigade by the time these instructions arrived and the action soon grew into a desperate fight. After 4 hours Soult's men were driven from Witikon and the fighting continued all through the day. As things began to look serious for Soult, Masséna, musket in hand, led a counter-attack at the head of his reserve grenadiers. The combined effort eventually pushed back the Austrians and secured the camp after a bloody fight, the French losing 500 killed and wounded, including Masséna's Chief of Staff Chérin mortally wounded.

== Attack on the Zürichberg ==
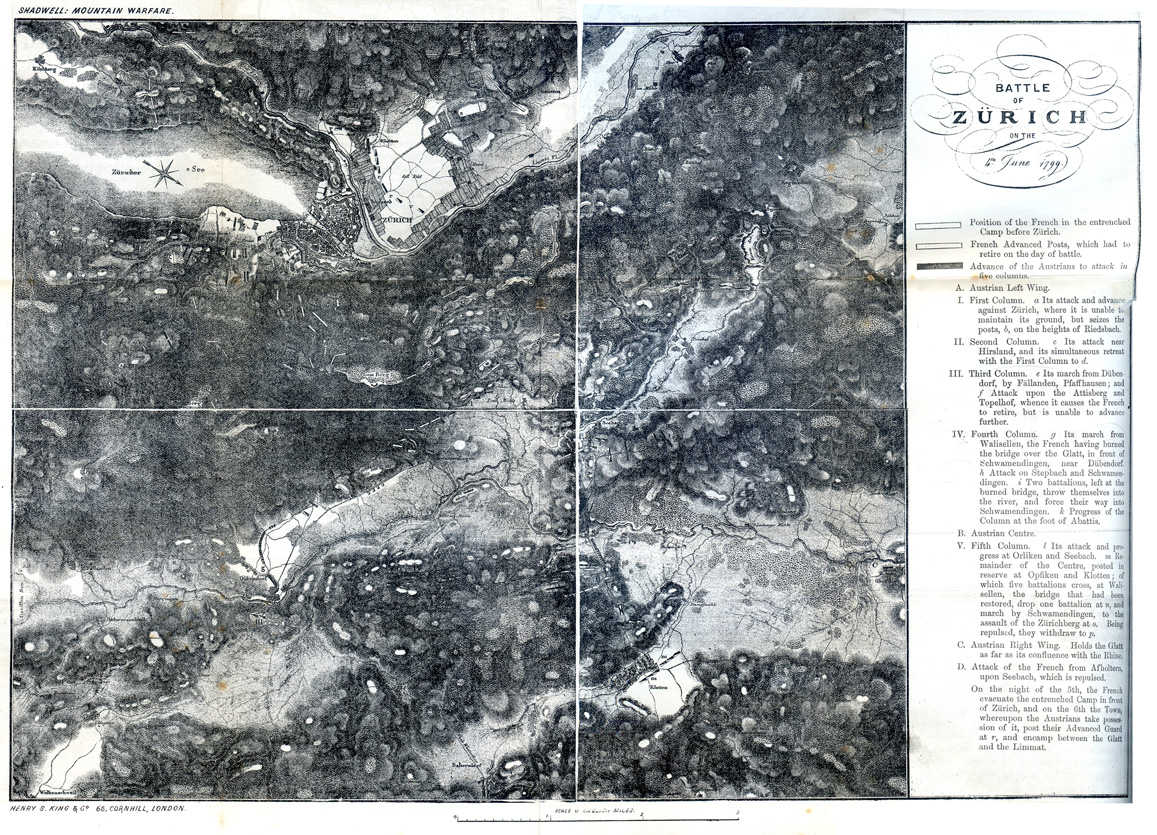
Map of the First Battle of Zurich, 4 June 1799

The next day on 4 June, Charles crossed the Glatt and launched a broad attack in five columns:

- On the Austrian left, the First column under Jelačić (five battalions and three squadrons) marched against Zürich along the high road and succeeded in breaking through the Rapperswil gate but was driven back by Gazan's brigade of Oudinot's Division, and despite repeated attacks made no further headway.
- To its right, the Second Column under Bey (four battalions and three squadrons) seized the village of Hirslanden and attempted to climb the slopes; however, the French under Brunet counterattacked and forced the Austrians back to join the First Column.
- The Third Column under the Prince of Lorraine found its direct route of march impractical and was diverted via Fällanden and Pfaffhausen. However, the attack failed before a murderous fire from the entrenchments.
- The Fourth Column under Hotze (seven battalions and 12 squadrons) crossed the Glatt at Dübendorf behind the third column, and advancing through Stettbach, drove the French from Schwamendingen.
- The Fifth Column under the Prince of Reuss (10 battalions and 20 squadrons) carried Seebach and Oerlikon then detached part of its command under Rosenberg on its left at Oerlikon to join in the assault on Zürich.

Oudinot, though missing half of his force in Zürich, nevertheless threw himself on Rosenberg, attempting to drive in the Austrian flank. After a desperate fight, the French were driven back, Oudinot carried from the field wounded by a ball in the chest. Charles' right flank under Nauendorf (15 battalions and 9 squadrons) remained held back to guard Glattfelden.

On the Zürichberg, Soult's Division was assailed by three columns and pinned down to their trenches. Repeated assaults were beaten off and the fighting bogged down into an intense firefight. At 2:00 pm, Charles assembled five battalions from his reserve including his own Guard of honour and directed Olivier, Count of Wallis to lead these storming up the hill. Leaving one battalion to watch the bridges, Wallis led the other four up a steep and narrow ravine against the French defences. The combat degenerated into close hand-to-hand fighting, with soldiers using the butts of their muskets against the French abatis.

At last at 8:00 pm, after a desperate fight, the Austrians were able to break through and pour into the camp behind. Sword in hand, Soult and his staff placed themselves at the head of a few companies of troops, launched a counter-attack against the rear of the Austrian column and drove them back to the bottom of the hill. Masséna urged his artillery to redouble their efforts and brought up his reserve of grenadiers. The Austrian attack crumbled; those in the camp were scattered, those behind driven back.

Over the course of the day, Charles lost 2,000 men, including three generals wounded, and 1,200 prisoners. The French lost more than 1,200 killed and wounded.

== Aftermath ==
After the bloody fighting on the 4th Charles fell back a short distance to recover and devise a second attack for the 6th. Masséna used the time on the 5th to regroup, and that night as the Austrians assembled for their attack, he withdraw to a strong position in front of Zürich, abandoning 28 guns commandeered from Zürich. His forces were now more concentrated, while the lake would oblige his opponent to divide his forces.

The second day of battle never came. At noon on the 6th, following a parley, the French were allowed to leave Zürich, Masséna withdrew to the Uetliberg and arrange his line along the banks of the Limmat. In Zürich, Charles found 150 cannons of various calibers. The outcome of the battle also damaged Austro-Russian relations, because Charles failed to follow up on the French defeat, which meant a strategic unsuccess for the Austrians, but it cannot be called a strategic victory for the French either.

In terms of personnel, both sides lost a general: Louis Nicolas Hyacinthe Chérin and Olivier Wallis.

== See also ==
- French Revolutionary Wars: Campaigns of 1799

== Notes ==
Preceded by Battle of San Giuliano	French Revolution: Revolutionary campaigns First Battle of Zurich	Succeeded by Battle of Trebbia (1799)
