= Battle of Frauenfeld =

War of the second coalition encounter

Battle of Fraunfeld
- Part of the War of the Second Coalition
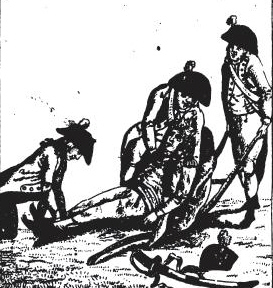
- Death of General Weber
Date	25 May 1799
Location	Frauenfeld, Thurgau, Switzerland 47°33′N 8°54′E
Result	French victory

Belligerents
France; Helvetic Republic	Austria

Commanders and leaders
André Masséna; Nicolas Oudinot; Nicolas Soult; Augustin Keller	Archduke Charles; Friedrich von Hotze; Franz Petrasch; Johann Weber †

Strength
23,000	10,000

Casualties and losses
230 killed 570 wounded	750 killed 1,450 wounded 3,000 captured

War of the Second Coalition:
Austria
The color black indicates the current battle.

The Battle of Frauenfeld was a military encounter during the War of the Second Coalition (1799-1802). It took place on 25 May 1799 between Austrian and French troops. The battle ended in the evening with the retreat of the Austrians, but on the following day the French withdrew.

== Background ==
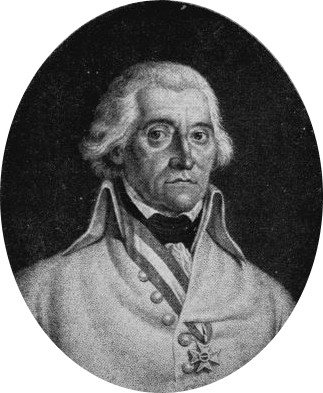
General Friedrich von Hotze

The Swiss Old Confederacy was occupied by the French Empire in 1798 and the French-supported Helvetic Republic was established on its territory. Thus, at the beginning of the War of the Second Coalition, French troops under General André Masséna (1758–1817) were operating on Swiss soil. After defeats in the Battle of Feldkirch and the Battle of Stockach, the French had to pull back and abandon eastern Switzerland. Two Austrian armies under General Friedrich von Hotze (1739–1799) and Archduke Charles (1771–1847) pursued them. They sought to unite these two armies as quickly as possible. On 22 May 1799, the vanguard of the Archduke's army reached Frauenfeld, where they stopped in order to meet up with the vanguard of General Hotze's army, which occurred on 24 May.

After the advance troops of the Austrians had already linked up, General Massena who was stationed at Winterthur decided to make an attempt to prevent the enemy's main forces from linking together. At this point he posted four French and two Helvetian Battalions, a company of Helvetian sharpshooters, five squadrons of Hussars and eight cannons under General Charles Nicolas Oudinot (1767–1847) and General Augustin Keller (1754–1799) to meet the enemy at Frauenfeld. General Nicolas Soult (1769–1851) followed in reserve with three more French and three Helvetian battalions.

== Battle ==
On the morning of 25 May 1799, around 5 o'clock, General Oudinot encountered the weak Austrian garrison at Frauenfeld. These troops slowly withdrew over the Thur. Around 9 o'clock however more troops from Hotze's army arrived (six battalions and six squadrons) under Franz Petrasch of Wyl, on the left flank and in the rear of the French. The French were forced to bring their main force up against this new enemy. About 22,000 Austrians were now arrayed against about 14,000 French and Swiss troops. This clash continued without a clear victor until evening. As a result, there were very heavy losses. The Adjutant General of the Helvetian troops himself, General Johann Weber (1752–1799) fell victim to a sharpshooter. Since the outcome of the battle was so unclear, General Petrasch decided to retreat at 7 o'clock in the evening. The Austrians lost about 5,000 men in the battle (mostly captured) and two cannons.

During the battle, two further columns of Massena's army attacked the Austrian archduke's main forces near Rorbas and Andelfingen in order to push them back over the Thur. After some initial success, however, the French were themselves pushed back. Despite the tactical success at Frauenfeld, Massena's position thus remained untenable and he led a withdrawal in the direction of Zurich on 26 May. Contemporaries, like Carl von Clausewitz, criticised Massena for having three columns (and the reserve under Soult) operate separately from one another instead of concentrating his whole force against Hotze's army. Only in this way, they said, could he have defeated the Austrians.

== Aftermath ==
Because of the failure of the French attack on the Archduke's army and the subsequent French retreat, there was no further obstacle to the union of the two Austrian armies. After further defeats, the French army scored a victory at the end of September in the Second Battle of Zurich. After this, the French regained the city of Frauenfeld and other territory.

== Bibliography ==
- Carl von Clausewitz: Die Feldzüge von 1796 und 1799 in Italien und in der Schweiz, Mundus-Verlag, Leipzig 1999, p. 435
- Rudolf Hanhart: Erzählungen aus der Schweizergeschichte nach den Chroniken, Part 4, Basel 1838, pp. 632–636 (Online-Version)
- Johann Georg Heinzmann: Kleine Schweizer Chronik, Part 2, Bern 1801, pp. 636–646 (Online-Version)
- Max Steiner: Das Gefecht von Frauenfeld 1799, Verlag Huber, Frauenfeld 1999, ISBN 978-3-7193-1170-4
- Bodart, Gaston (1908). Militär-historisches Kriegs-Lexikon (1618–1905).
