= Franz Petrasch =

Austrian general officer

Franz, Freiherr von Petrasch (1746 – 17 January 1820) was an Austrian general officer serving in the Austrian Empire during the French Revolutionary Wars. He was the third generation of a bourgeois family in which two brothers, seeking adventure, joined the Habsburg military and rose through the ranks. The family was elevated to the Moravia nobility in the early eighteenth century, and to the Hungarian nobility in 1722.

Franz Petrasch served throughout the Habsburg's wars with France, in particular the Rhine Campaign of 1796 and the Swiss campaigns of 1799.

== Family von Petrasch ==
The Petrasch family was established in Moravia, near Brno, a wealth family of bourgeois origins. Two brothers, Ernst Anton and Maximilian, emerged in the late seventeenth century. They joined the military and in 1695 fought under Count Friedrich Veterani in the seven cavalry regiments of 6,500 men and 800 infantry at Lugos against Sultan Mustafa II. Ernst Anton later served in the War of the Spanish SuccessionHe had a son, Ernst Gottlieb. Maximilian was badly injured at Lugos; this wound never healed and in later life made it difficult, or impossible, for him to mount a horse. Eventually he retired to his estate near Breslau, where he died at the age of 56 after several weeks of suffering. He had married Maria Anna, Countess of Becker, and had a son, Joseph von Petrasch, the famous Enlightenment scholar and founder of The Society of Anonymous Scholars in the Austrian Lands, of which he was president until 1758. Joseph and Anne von Hettersdorf married eventually they had three daughters.

Ernst Gottlieb, son of Ernst Anton, had been born in Teschen, Austrian Silesia, in 1708. Like his cousin Joseph, he also enjoyed a good education. The educated and informed baron soon gained the favor of the Empress Maria Theresa. Petrasch organized the illuminations and fireworks on the occasion of the second marriage of the Archduke with Josepha of Bavaria in the Schwarzenberg Garden. As an imperial favorite, he was given the castle Holitsch, and made master of Prerau. The Empress extended his father's barony to a Hungarian barony 30 January 1767. Earnst Gottlieb married Elizabeth von Fritz (or Friss), a favorite maid of the Empress Maria Theresa, and they had a son, Franz, born in 1746 at the family estate in Prerau, and a daughter, who married the son of Claude-Hyacinthe-Henri Foucher, Baron de Bretton (d. 24 March 1779). Ernst Gottlieb died in Vienna on 30 June 1792.

== Military career ==
Little is evident of Franz Petrasch's early life other than that he was the son of Ernst Gottlieb, a favored courtier, and was born on his father's estates in Prerau, Moravia. He joined the Habsburg military as a twenty-year-old cadet (in 1766). From 1785 to 1788 he was lieutenant colonel commanding a grenadier battalion, before being made colonel then and commander of Infantry Regiment No. 37 "Baron de Vins" at the beginning of 1792.

By 1794 he had been elevated to major general commanding an infantry brigade in the Austrian Netherlands (present-day Belgium). He served in Beaulieu and Werneck's columns at the second action at Charleroi 16 June.

=== Service on the Rhine ===
In 1796 he was promoted to lieutenant field marshal and was dispatched to command a brigade in Germany under the Archduke Charles. In September he commanded a 5,564 man mobile corps detached between the Neckar and the Rhine, securing the territories between the Austrian garrisons of Mannheim and Philippsburg). There, he operated behind French forces under Moreau. On 18 September he raided Kehl, cutting off Moreau, but his troops failed to burn the bridge and was driven out again. Petrasch then occupied Stuttgart. His advance posts were driven back by Desaix at Villingen on 9 October, then suffered a defeat at the Battle of Ettenheim. Petrasch then re-joined Charles and Latour to defeat Moreau at the Battle of Emmendingen, where he assumed command of Wartensleben's column after the old general was wounded.

In 1799 Petrasch commanded a division under Archduke Charles and fought at Stockach (25 March), on the right wing, near Liptingen. He was then under lieutenant field marshal Friedrich Freiherr von Hotze in the clashes of Frauenfeld (25 May) and Winterthur (27 May). In the First Battle of Zürich (4 June), he was on the left wing, at Wallisellen. When Hotze was wounded in the assault on Mount Zürich, he handed over command to Petrasch.

In August 1799, when Charles took most of the army north into Swabia, Petrasch remained in Switzerland, as second-in-command of Hotze's Austrian corps (11 battalions, 10 squadrons, total of 10,000 men), cooperating with the Russians under lieutenant general Alexander Korsakov. When Hotze was killed while on a reconnaissance ride on 25 September, prior to the Second Battle of Zürich, Petrasch took over command and withdrew to Feldkirch, losing 5,000 men, 25 guns and 4 colors. In 1800, he commanded the garrison at the Ulm fortress.

=== 1799 Campaign ===
At the beginning of hostilities Petrasch commanded a Division of Wallis' 1st Corps under Charles on the Danube, and served at the Battle of Stockach 25 March. During the invasion of Switzerland in May he was detached to link with the Vorarlberg Corps of Hotze, his command becoming the reserve. He commanded the 4th Column in Hotze's left wing at the First Battle of Zurich (Zurich Berg) 4 June, and temporarily replaced Hotze when that officer was wounded. During the Second Battle of Zurich after the death of Hotze on the Linth 25 September he replaced him as commander of the Vorarlberg Corps, then, learning of the defeat of Korsakov's Russians, retreated precipitously beyond the Rhine, effectively abandoning the Corps of Alexander Suvorov to suffer the full attentions of the French. Transferred to command the garrison of Ulm on the Danube in December, he was left behind at Ulm with 10,000 men when Kray retreated after the Battle of Höchstadt 19 June.

== Promotions ==
- October 1793 major general
- 4 March 1796, provisionally, lieutenant field marshal, 12 February 1796.

Petrasch died 17 January 1820 in Vienna.
