= Heinrich XV, Prince Reuss of Greiz =

Austrian Field Marshal (1751–1825)

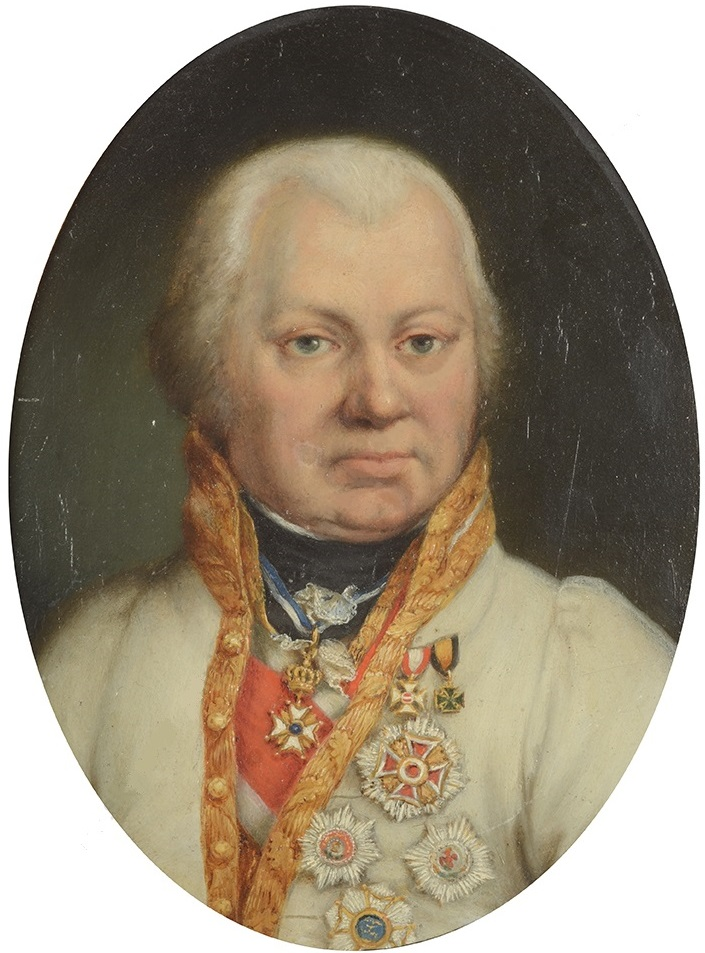
- 1820 portrait
- Born: 22 February 1751; Greiz Castle, Imperial County of Reuss, Holy Roman Empire
- Died: 30 August 1825 (aged 74) Greiz Castle, Principality of Reuss-Greiz, German Confederation
- Allegiance: Austrian Empire
- Service years: 1766–1824
- Rank: Feldmarschall
- Conflicts: Austro-Turkish War (1787–91); French Revolutionary Wars; Napoleonic Wars
- Awards: Knight's Cross Military Order of Maria Theresa (1809); Military Order of Max Joseph (1813); Order of Leopold (1814); Order of St. Alexander Nevsky (1814)
- Other work: Inhaber Infantry Regiment # 17 (1801–1825)

Heinrich XV, Prince Reuss of Greiz (22 February 1751 – 30 August 1825) was the fourth of six sons born into the reigning family of the Principality of Reuss. At the age of fifteen he joined the army of the Habsburg monarchy and later fought against Ottoman Turkey. During the French Revolutionary Wars he became a general officer and saw extensive service. He commanded a corps during the Napoleonic Wars. From 1801 until his death, he was Proprietor (Inhaber) of an Austrian infantry regiment.

Prince Heinrich came to the attention of the Habsburg king in his thirties. After distinguishing himself in battle against the Turks, the emperor promoted him to command an infantry regiment. He served against the French First Republic in the Flanders Campaign and was promoted to the rank of general. The year 1796 found him leading Austrian troops against the army of Napoleon Bonaparte. In the following year he commanded a division.

In 1799 Prince Heinrich fought against France in Germany and Switzerland. He led a division in northern Italy during the War of the Third Coalition. In the Danube campaign of 1809, he started out leading a division and ended the war in command of a corps. In 1813, he led a successful diplomatic effort to cause the Kingdom of Bavaria to change sides and join the Allies against Napoleon. Into his seventies he served Austria in various military and civil positions.

== Early career ==
Heinrich XV was born into an ancient House of Reuss at Greiz Castle on 22 February 1751. His parents, Count (later Prince) Heinrich XI Reuss von Ober-Greiz and his first wife, Countess Konradine Reuss zu Köstritz, carried on the family tradition of naming all their male children Heinrich and numbering them consecutively. They duly named their six sons Heinrich XII through Heinrich XVII, while their five daughters were christened Amalie, Frederike, Isabella, Marie, and Ernestine. Belonging to the Reuss Elder Line, Heinrich XV was entitled to be called Prince (Fürst), but he was not the reigning prince. That dignity was held by his surviving elder brother Heinrich XIII from 1800 to 1817.

Heinrich XV enlisted in the Austrian Macquire Infantry Regiment # 35 in 1766. He, his father, and brothers became princes in 1778. When Maria Theresa died in 1780, and Joseph II of Austria became emperor in fact as well as name, Joseph favored the young prince, promoting him to Major in 1784. During the Austro-Turkish War (1787–91), the emperor appointed Reuss to his staff. For notable service at the storming of Šabac in 1788, the emperor promoted the prince to Oberst (Colonel) of the Wenzel Colloredo Infantry Regiment # 56. Reuss fought at the Siege of Belgrade in the fall of 1789.

== French Revolutionary Wars ==
=== War of the First Coalition ===
In the spring of 1793, Prince Heinrich successfully defended a position against the French and received promotion to General-Major in May. He served on the staff of Prince Josias of Saxe-Coburg-Saalfeld and was present at the Battle of Avesnes-le-Sec on 12 September. In this action, Prince Johann of Liechtenstein and 2,000 cavalry crushed a force of 7,000 French troops, inflicting 2,000 casualties and capturing 2,000 more. At the beginning of 1796, Reuss commanded an infantry brigade on the upper Rhine.

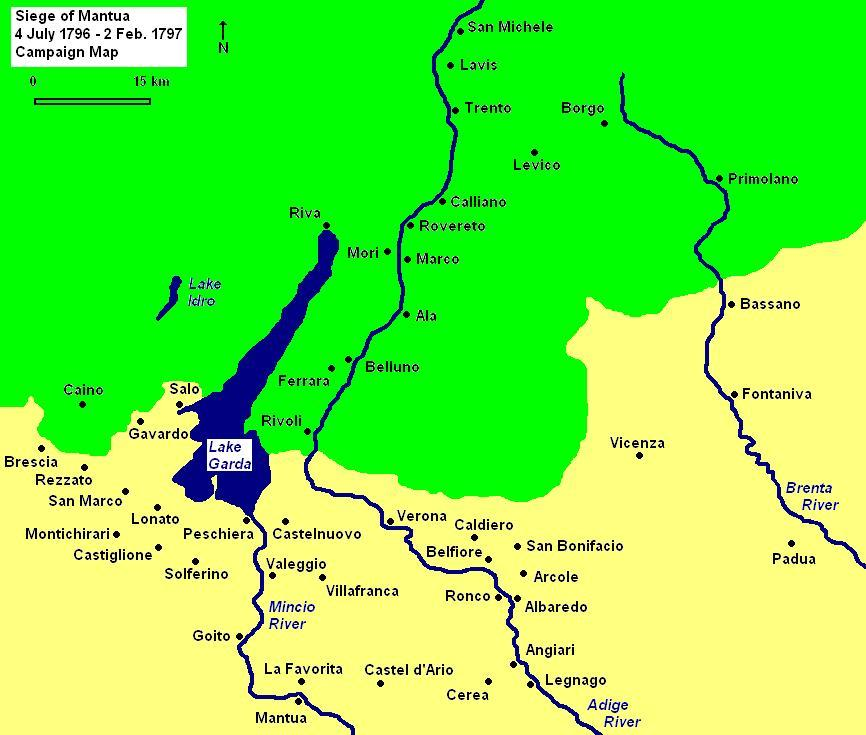
Siege of Mantua Campaign Map 1796–1797

Bonaparte's victories over Johann Peter Beaulieu in April and May 1796 altered the strategic situation. When the Austrian high command transferred Dagobert von Wurmser from Germany to Italy, Reuss and heavy reinforcements went with him. During the first relief of the Siege of Mantua, the 45-year-old prince led a brigade in Peter Quasdanovich's column on the west side of Lake Garda. At first, operations went well for the Austrians, but Bonaparte defeated Quasdanovich in the complex Battle of Lonato and forced him to retreat to Riva del Garda. At the height of the battle, on 3 August, Reuss seized Desenzano del Garda, rescuing some recently captured soldiers belonging to Joseph Ocskay's command. However, the proximity of superior numbers of French troops soon compelled him to retreat to Gavardo.

During the second relief of Mantua, Heinrich led a 5,200-man brigade in Paul Davidovich's corps. His area of responsibility stretched from the northern tip of Lake Garda to Trento on the west side of the Adige river. On 3 September a 10,000-man French division led by Claude Belgrand de Vaubois drove his outposts out of Nago–Torbole on the lake. An overconfident army command ordered him to attack the French the next day, but he admitted that this was not possible. In the subsequent Battle of Rovereto on 4 September, he defended the camp of Mori on the west bank, while his colleagues Josef Vukassovich and Johann Sporck held Marco on the east bank. Bonaparte in greatly superior strength routed Davidovich's corps and drove them north of Trento.

In the fourth relief of Mantua, the new army commander József Alvinczi assigned Reuss to command the largest column in his army, nearly 7,900 soldiers. Reuss followed the west bank of the Adige, while Vukassovich's column marched on the east bank, and the rest of the army followed roads and trails farther west near Monte Baldo. During the Battle of Rivoli, the troops under Reuss bravely fought their way out of the river bottom to the plateau against tenacious resistance. At this moment, a desperate French counterattack panicked some Austrians from the other columns and drove them to seek refuge in the river valley. Disordered by fleeing troops and attacked from two sides by the French, Reuss' column retreated to the bottom of the gorge where their commander managed to rally them. With Reuss checked, Bonaparte defeated the remaining Austrians on the plateau and won the battle.

Heinrich was promoted to Feldmarschal-Leutnant on 1 March 1797. During the withdrawal from Italy that month, Reuss led a division in the left wing under Archduke Charles, retreating to Ljubljana (Laibach).

=== War of the Second Coalition ===
On 25 and 26 March 1799, Heinrich fought under Archduke Charles at the Battle of Stockach and the Battle of Winterthur in May. He led a division of Archduke Charles' Center at the First Battle of Zurich in June. His immediate commander, Olivier, Count of Wallis received a mortal wound during the engagement. Between March and September 1800 he defended the Vorarlberg and the Tyrol. Emperor Francis II named him Proprietor (Inhaber) of Reuss-Plauen Infantry Regiment # 17 in 1801. He remained the proprietor until his death. His brother Heinrich XIII was proprietor of Reuss-Greiz Infantry Regiment # 55 from 1803 to 1809, and Reuss-Greiz Infantry Regiment # 18 from 1809 to 1817.

== Napoleonic Wars ==
Heinrich served under Archduke Charles in Italy during the War of the Third Coalition. The original organization of the Armee von Italien called for Reuss to command an eight-battalion division. But at the Battle of Caldiero on 29–31 October 1805, Charles gave him command of the left wing. Reuss played a prominent role in the fighting, commanding Johann Kalnássy's brigade of eight line infantry battalions, Heironymus Colloredo-Mansfeld's brigade of five grenadier battalions, and the Archduke Charles Uhlan Regiment # 3. The fog lifted around 11 am on 30 October and Reuss' troops were immediately assaulted by Guillaume Philibert Duhesme's division. Caldiero village, held by his troops, changed hands several times during the day, as Duhesme attacked and Reuss counterattacked. The day ended with Caldiero in French hands, but the Austrian line intact. On 31 October, Reuss repelled a French probe of the Austrian left flank. The next day, Charles withdrew to the east and no more major actions occurred in the campaign.

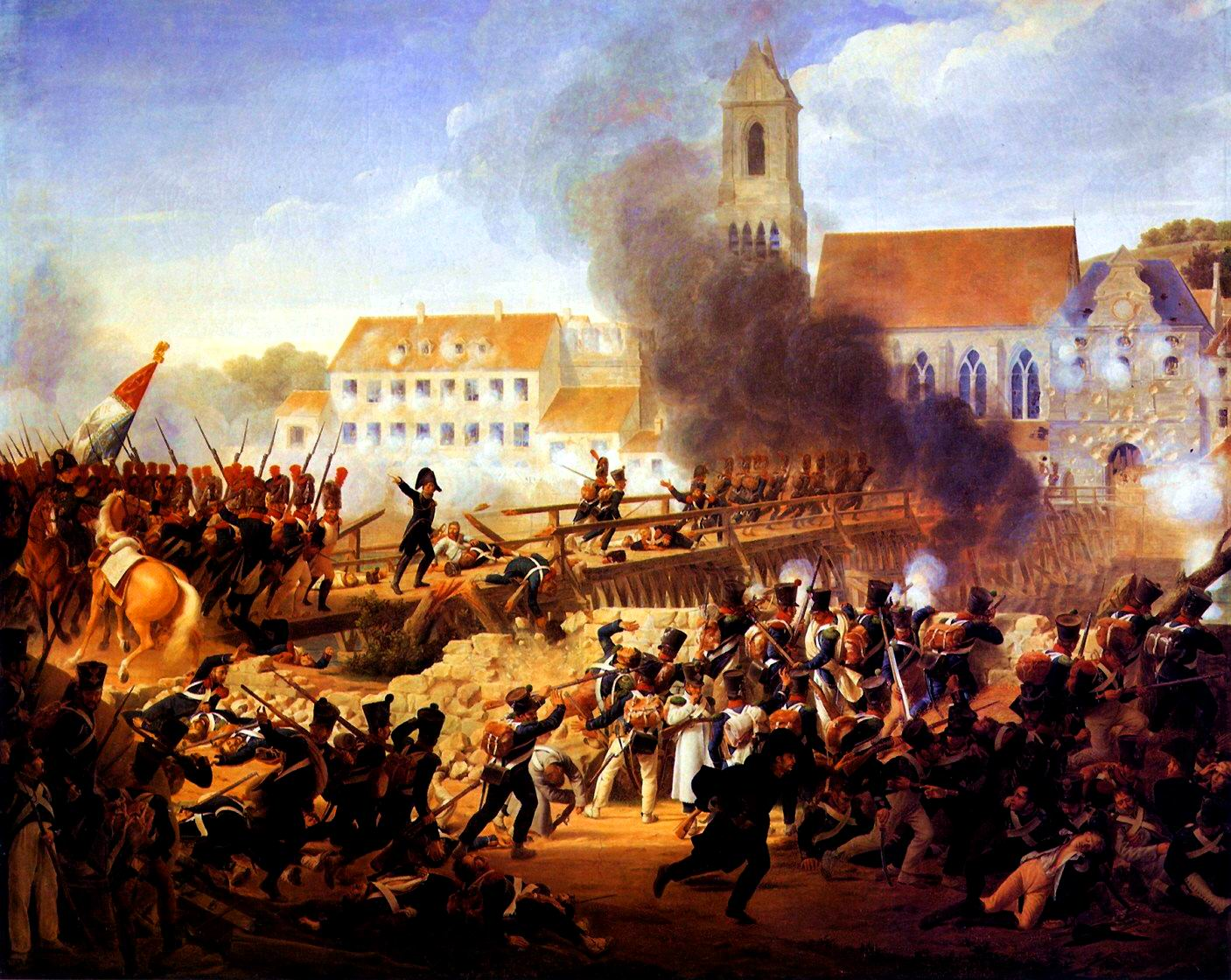
Reuss led a division at the Battle of Landshut

The War of the Fifth Coalition found Heinrich leading a division in the V Armeekorps under Archduke Louis of Austria. He commanded 12 battalions in the brigades of Federico Bianchi and Franz Schulz von Rothacker. In the campaign culminating in the Battle of Eckmühl on 22 April, he fought at the battles of Abensberg and Landshut. He led an attacking column in a successful action at Neumarkt-Sankt Veit on 24 April. He participated in the Battle of Ebersberg on 3 May.

On 15 May, Heinrich received promotion to Feldzeugmeister and was appointed to command V Armeekorps. He missed the Battle of Aspern-Essling because his troops were detailed to watch the Nussdorf sector. By the orders of Archduke Charles, his small corps also sat out the Battle of Wagram. Instead, they guarded the Danube river crossings to the west of the battlefield. His 8,958 troops included the brigades of Johann Neustädter, Philipp Pfluger, and Johann Klebelsberg. On 10 July, Reuss held off the pursuing French army in a successful rearguard action at Schöngrabern. The following day, his corps participated in a much larger action at Znaim, where each side lost about 6,000 casualties. In the early hours of 12 July, both sides agreed to a cease fire. For the actions of 10–11 July, Heinrich received the Knight's Cross of the Military Order of Maria Theresa.

In 1813, he commanded the Army of the Danube, a corps of observation on the Bavarian frontier. On 8 October, he signed the Treaty of Ried with Karl Philipp von Wrede, which resulted in the Kingdom of Bavaria switching sides and joining the allies against Napoleon. This act earned him the Order of Leopold from Austria and the Military Order of Max Joseph from Bavaria. Russia honored him with the Order of St. Alexander Nevsky. He was Governor of the Duchy of Milan and Viceroy of Lombardy–Venetia in 1814–15, earning the Gold Medal for civilian service and the Order of the Iron Crown. Later he served as Governor of Galicia. He was promoted Feldmarschall when he retired from the army on 10 September 1824. He died on 30 August 1825 at Greiz Castle, having never married.

== Notes ==
Government offices
Preceded by Luigi Cocastelli (vacant 1799–1814)	Governor of the Duchy of Milan; 1814–1815	Succeeded by Count Heinrich von Bellegarde
Military offices
Preceded by Friedrich Wilhelm, Fürst zu Hohenlohe-Kirchberg (vacant 1796–1801)	Proprietor (Inhaber) of Infantry Regiment # 17; 1801–1825	Succeeded by Karl Gustav Heinrich Wilhelm, Prinz zu Hohenlohe-Langenburg
