= Jean Baptiste Brunet =

French general (1763–1824)

Jean-Baptiste Brunet
- Born: 7 July 1763; Reims, France
- Died: 21 September 1824 (aged 61) Vitry-sur-Seine, France
- Allegiance: France
- Branch: Infantry
- Rank: General of Division
- Conflicts: War of the First Coalition; Battle of Fleurus (1794); Rhine Campaign of 1795; Rhine Campaign of 1796; War of the Second Coalition; Battle of Ostrach (1799); Battle of Stockach (1799); First Battle of Zurich (1799); Second Battle of Zurich (1799); Saint-Domingue expedition (1802)

Jean Baptiste Brunet (7 July 1763 – 21 September 1824) was a French general of division in the French Revolutionary Army. He was responsible for the arrest of Toussaint Louverture. He was promoted to command a light infantry demi-brigade at the Fleurus in 1794. He led the unit in François Joseph Lefebvre's division in the 1795, 1796 and 1799 campaigns. He was the son of French general Gaspard Jean-Baptiste Brunet who was guillotined in 1793.

== Career ==
Brunet became Chef de brigade (colonel) of the 13th Light Infantry Demi-brigade on 26 June 1794. This was the same day as the Battle of Fleurus where the 13th Light fought in François Joseph Lefebvre's division. He was still the commanding officer when this unit became the 25th Light Infantry Demi-brigade on 1 July 1796. (Note: Broughton gave a date of 1 July 1795. This is probably a typo because he also stated the 25th Light was not renumbered until 1796.) The 13th Light was in Lefebvre's Advance Guard on 1 October during the Rhine Campaign of 1795. The 25th Light fought under Lefebvre at the time of the Battle of Würzburg on 3 September in the Rhine Campaign of 1796.

Still in Lefebvre's division, the 25th Light fought at the Battle of Ostrach on 21 March 1799 and the Battle of Stockach on 25 March. The 25th Light was in the 3rd Division at the First Battle of Zurich on 4 June 1799. Brunet was promoted general of brigade on 10 June 1799. He led a brigade in Édouard Mortier's 4th Division at the Second Battle of Zurich on 25–26 September 1799. The division consisted of the 50th, 53rd, 100th and 108th Line Infantry Demi-brigades, the 1st Dragoons and the 8th Chasseurs à Cheval. He assumed the rank of general of division on 7 June 1802.

== Arrest of Toussaint Louverture ==
Charles Leclerc originally asked Jean-Jacques Dessalines to arrest Louverture, but he declined. The task then fell to Brunet. However accounts differ as regards how he accomplished this. One account has it that Brunet pretended that he planned to settle in Saint-Domingue and asked for Toussaint's advice about plantation management. Louverture's memoirs however suggest that Brunet's troops had been provocative, leading Louverture to seek a discussion with him. Embarrassed about his trickery, Brunet absented himself during the arrest. He was captured by the British and not released until 1814.

== Notes ==
Footnotes

Citations
