= Olivier, Count of Wallis =

Field Master of Artillery, French Revolutionary Wars (1742–1799)

Oliver Remigius, Count von Wallis
- Born: 1 October 1742; Vienna, Austria
- Died: 19 July 1799 (aged 56) Kloten, Switzerland
- Allegiance: Habsburg monarchy
- Branch: Colonel-Proprietor (Inhaber), 29th Infantry Regiment (Austria); Wallis Regiment
- Service years: c. 1757 – 1799
- Rank: Feldzeugmeister
- Commands: Vice Director General of Artillery
- Conflicts: Austro-Turkish War (1788–1791); French Revolutionary Wars

Oliver Remigius, Count von Wallis, Baron von Carrighmain, (1 October 1742 – 19 July 1799) the scion of the distinguished Irish Walsh family in Habsburg military service, served in Austria's wars with the Ottoman Empire (1787–1791), and in the French Revolutionary Wars (1791–1800). He died of wounds received in action at the First Battle of Zürich.

== Family and youth ==
Oliver Remigius was born on 1 October 1742, a son of Field Marshal Franz Wenzel von Wallis (1696–1774) and his wife Countess Maria Rosa Regina von Thürheim (1705–1777), into an Irish exiled family living in the Habsburg Empire.
During the 17th century, laws introduced in Ireland limited, and eventually removed, authority from the Catholic aristocracy, preventing Catholics from inheriting land, sitting in Parliament, and holding office. Many immigrated to Central Europe and sought service in the Habsburg military. One ancestor, Richard Walsh or "Wallis", as he had been known in Ireland, emigrated with his family in 1612, and became a colonel in the Habsburg military. He was killed at the Battle of Lützen in 1632. Another ancestor of Oliver Remigius, George Olivier, Count von Wallis, son of Richard, also served in the Habsburg military during the Thirty Years War under Wallenstein.

Wallis and his older brother Michael Johann Ignaz were both intended for military service. As a young man, Wallis entered his father's regiment, the 11th Infantry, and from 1769 to 1777, he commanded it. On 26 November 1777, he was promoted to major general. In the wars against the Turks (1787–92) he served under Field Marshal Ernst Gideon von Laudon and, later, Count von Charles Joseph de Croix, Count of Clerfayt. In 1787, he was promoted to Feldmarschall-leutnant, and in 1791, as Colonel-Proprietor of the 29th Infantry Regiment, which bore his name until 1802.

== French Revolutionary Wars ==
In the 1792 campaign of the War of the First Coalition, Wallis commanded a mixed division in the corps of Friedrich Wilhelm, Fürst zu Hohenlohe-Kirchberg, on the upper Rhine and the Moselle, stationed on the Rhine river between Basel and Strassburg. On 21 May 1794, he received his promotion to Feldzeugmeister, or Field Marshal of Artillery. In late 1795, he was transferred to northern Italy. On 22 November, he assumed command of the Army of Lombardy from Joseph Nikolaus De Vins, on the eve of the Battle of Loano. On 24 November, he lost all his artillery and wagon train in the clash of San Giacomo. In April 1796, he was relieved of his command of the Habsburg army in Lombardy by Johann Peter Beaulieu.

Promotions

- Major: 1767
- Lieutenant Colonel: 1768
- Colonel: 1769
- Major General: 26 November 1777 (effective 29 April 1777)
- Feldmarschall-leutnant: 9 October 1787 (effective 4 October 1787)
- Field Master of Artillery: 21 May 1794 (effective 12 July 1794)

In 1798, Wallis was commanding General of Venetia. The following year, during the War of the Second Coalition, he commanded part of the Habsburg army in Swabia under Archduke Charles. He led the third column in its assault on the French positions in the Habsburr victory over General of Division Jordan's Army of the Danube at the Battle of Ostrach on 21 March. A week later, and in the French defeat at Stockach on 25 March, he commanded the right wing. From 14 to 25 April, while Archduke Charles was indisposed, Wallis assumed command of the main Habsburg army quartered on the shore of the Rhine River. A few weeks later, he commanded the reserve in the First Battle of Zürich on 4 June, where General of Division André Masséna, now commanding the Army of the Danube and the Army of Switzerland, was defeated and forced to withdraw across the Limmat river. During the battle, Wallis led five battalions of grenadiers in storming the French positions on Mount Zürich. He was badly wounded, and died five weeks later, on 19 July 1799.

== Offices ==
In 1769, Wallis became Oberst in command of Franz Wallis Infantry Regiment Nr. 11, succeeding Robert von Amelungen. In 1777, Carl von Prigglach was appointed Oberst. In 1791, Wallis was appointed Inhaber (proprietor) of Infantry Regiment Nr. 29. He succeeded Ernst Gideon von Laudon as inhaber. After his death, the position remained vacant until 1803 when Karl Friedrich von Lindenau became inhaber.

== Sources ==
=== Bibliography ===
- (in German) Ebert, Jens-Florian. "Wallis, Olivier Remigus, Count von." Die Österreichischen Generäle 1792–1815. Accessed 26 December 2009.
- Littell, Eliakim and Robert S. Littell. Littell's living age. Boston, MA: T.H. Carter & Co., 1844–1896. Volume 115 (1872).
- Smith, Digby. The Napoleonic Wars Data Book. London: Greenhill, 1998. ISBN 1-85367-276-9.
- Smith, Digby. "Wallis". Leopold Kudrna and Digby Smith (compilers). A biographical dictionary of all Austrian Generals in the French Revolutionary and Napoleonic Wars, 1792–1815. Napoleon Series, Robert Burnham, editor in chief. April 2008 version. Accessed 15 December 2009.
- (in German) Stanka, Julius (Major). Geschichte des K. und K. Infanterie-Regimentes Erzherzog Carl No. 13. Wien: im Selbstverlag des Regiments, 1894. Volume 1.
- Wrede, Alphons (1898). "Geschichte der K. und K. Wehrmacht, Vol. 1" (in German). Vienna: L. W. Seidel & Sohn.

Military offices
| Preceded by Robert von Amelungen | Oberst (Colonel) of Infantry Regiment Nr. 11; 1769–1777 | Succeeded by Carl von Prugglach |
| Preceded by Ernst Gideon von Laudon | Proprietor (Inhaber) of Infantry Regiment Nr. 29; 1791–1799 | Succeeded by Karl Friedrich von Lindenau |
