= Alexander Korsakov =

Russian general

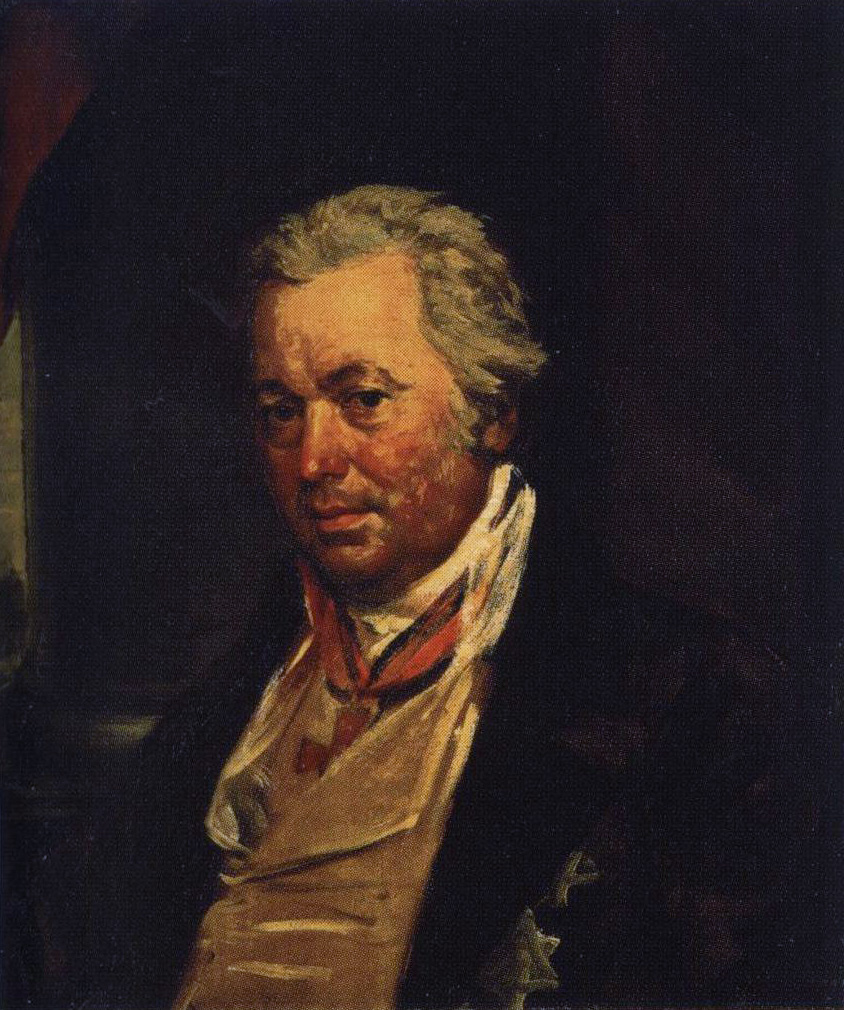
Portrait by Alexander Varnek

Alexander Mikhailovich Rimsky-Korsakov (Russian: Алекса́ндр Миха́йлович Ри́мский-Ко́рсаков; August 24, 1753 – May 25, 1840) was a Russian general remembered as an unlucky assistant to Alexander Suvorov during his Swiss expedition of 1799–1800.

== Early career ==
Korsakov entered military service as a cadet in the Preobrazhensky Life Guards Regiment, and was appointed lieutenant colonel of the Chernigov Musketeer Regiment at age 25. He fought in the Russo-Turkish War in 1788 and 1789, and in the Russo-Swedish War. He subsequently became a major-general of the Semenovsky Regiment of the Leib Guard and was assigned to accompany the Count of Artois to England. From there he went to Flanders as Russian observer to the army commanded by Prince Josias of Coburg. His account to the tsarina of the Battle of Fleurus (1794) won him favour; on returning to St. Petersburg, he was dispatched to serve under Count Valerian Zubov in an ill-fated expedition against Persia, which Emperor Paul I recalled in 1799 in order to deal with the French Revolutionary Wars. In 1797, Korsakov was elevated to inspector general of Infantry, and the following year, general lieutenant.

== 1799 campaign in Switzerland ==
In 1798, Paul I gave Korsakov command of an expeditionary force of 30,000 men sent to Germany to join Austria in the fight against the French Republic. At the beginning of 1799, the force was diverted to drive the French out of Switzerland. Leaving Russia in May, Korsakov reached Stockach in 90 days. With 29,463 men, his command then marched to Zürich to join up with the 25,000-man corps of Austrian general Friedrich von Hotze. It was expected that Alexander Suvorov's army would join them from Italy after marching through the Alps, but terrain and enemy action held up Suvorov's advance. In the meantime, Korsakov waited near Zurich in a relaxed state of over-confidence. Taking full advantage of this, the French under André Masséna attacked on 25 September 1799, in the Second Battle of Zürich, winning a signal victory and forcing Korsakov to withdraw rapidly to Schaffhausen, despite almost no pursuit by the French and orders from Suvorov for him to hold his ground. Korsakov then took up a position on the east of the Rhine in the Dorflingen Camp (Dörflingen) between Schaffhausen and Constance, remaining there while Masséna was left free to deal with Suvorov. His left under Condé was driven from Constance on 7 October, on the same day he advanced from Büsingen against Schlatt, but was eventually driven back by Masséna, abandoning his hold on the left bank of the Rhine. He joined Suvorov’s survivors at Lindau on 18 October, and was shortly after relieved of command. Soon after he was dismissed as colonel-in-chief of the Rostov Musketeer Regiment in disgrace. The combined army turned towards Bohemia, from where Paul I recalled the army back to Russia for the winter.

== Later career ==
With the accession of Emperor Alexander I in 1801, Korsakov was re-appointed as a GvC cavalry general. He was Governor of Lithuania from 1806 to 1809, based at Vilna, and again from April to June, 1812. On the approach of the French he was ordered to withdraw by Barclay de Tolly on 28 June, but returned to serve for a third term as Governor-General of Lithuania from 8 December 1812 until 1830. During this time he ordered the reconstruction of the Tuskulėnai Manor in Vilnius, where he lived. Recalled to St. Petersberg after the Polish insurrection of 1830–31, Korsakov was made member of the State Council of Imperial Russia. He died in 1840.
