= Battle of Ostrach =

1799 battle of the War of the Second Coalition

- Part of the War of the Second Coalition
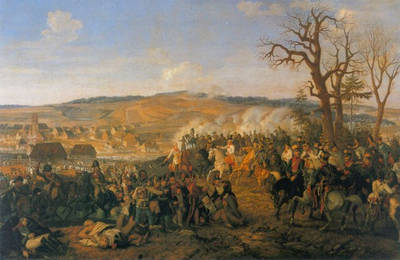
- Battle of Ostrach, unknown author
Date	20–21 March 1799
Location	Ostrach, Salem Abbey (Germany) 47°57′N 9°23′E
Result	Austrian victory

Belligerents
(Habsburg monarchy) Austria	France

Commanders and leaders
Archduke Charles	Jean-Baptiste Jourdan

Strength
52,000	28,000

Casualties and losses
2,113	2,257
- Digby Smith. Napoleonic Wars Databook: Actions and Losses in Personnel, Colours, Standards and Artillery, 1792–1815. Mechanicsburg PA: Stackpole, 1998, ISBN 1-85367-276-9, p. 147
- Location within Europe

War of the Second Coalition:
Austria
The color black indicates the current battle.

The Battle of Ostrach, also called the Battle by Ostrach, occurred on 20–21 March 1799. It was the first non-Italy-based battle of the War of the Second Coalition. The battle resulted in the victory of the Austrian forces, under the command of Archduke Charles, over the French forces, commanded by Jean-Baptiste Jourdan.

The battle occurred during Holy Week, 1799, amid rain and dense fog. Initially, the French were able to take, and hold, Ostrach and the nearby hamlet of Hoßkirch plus several strategic points on the Ostrach marsh. As the engagement began, Habsburg numerical superiority overwhelmed French defenses. By evening, the French left wing was flanked and Jourdan's men retreated from Ostrach to the Pfullendorf heights. On the next morning, as Jourdan considered a counter-attack, the weather broke, and he could look down on the Austrian battle array. The numbers and dispositions of the Austrians convinced him that any attack would be useless, and that he could not hope to maintain his position in the heights. As he withdrew, a portion of his right flank was cut off from the main force.

Although casualties appeared even on both sides, the Austrians had a significantly larger fighting force, both on the field at Ostrach, and stretched along a line between Lake Constance and Ulm. French casualties amounted to eight percent of the force and Austrian, approximately four percent. The French withdrew to Engen and Stockach, where a few days later the armies engaged again, this time with greater losses on both sides, and an Austrian victory.

== Background ==
Initially, the rulers of Europe, such as Joseph II, Holy Roman Emperor, viewed the revolution in France as an event between the French king and his subjects, and not something in which they should interfere. As the rhetoric grew more strident, however, the other monarchies started to view events with alarm. In 1790, Leopold succeeded his brother Joseph as emperor and by 1791, he considered the situation surrounding his sister, Marie Antoinette, and her children, with greater and greater alarm. In August 1791, in consultation with French émigré nobles and Frederick William II of Prussia, he issued the Declaration of Pillnitz, in which they declared the interest of the monarchs of Europe as one with the interests of Louis and his family. They threatened ambiguous, but quite serious, consequences if anything should happen to the royal family.

The French Republican position became increasingly difficult. Compounding problems in international relations, French émigrés continued to agitate for support of a counter-revolution abroad. Chief among them were the Prince Condé, his son, the Duke de Bourbon, and his grandson, the Duke d'Enghien. From their base in Koblenz, immediately over the French border, they sought direct support for military intervention from the royal houses of Europe, and raised an army.

On 20 April 1792, the French National Convention declared war on Austria. In this War of the First Coalition (1792–1798), France ranged itself against most of the European states sharing land or water borders with her, plus Portugal and the Ottoman Empire. Although the Coalition forces achieved several victories at Verdun, Kaiserslautern, Neerwinden, Mainz, Amberg and Würzburg, the efforts of Napoleon Bonaparte in northern Italy pushed Austrian forces back and resulted in the negotiation of the Peace of Leoben (17 April 1797) and the subsequent Treaty of Campo Formio (October 1797).

The treaty called for meetings between the involved parties to work out the exact territorial and remunerative details, to be convened at Rastatt. The French demand for more territory than originally agreed upon stalled negotiations. Despite their agreement at Campo Formio and the ongoing meetings at Rastatt, the two primary combatants of the First Coalition, France and Austria, were highly suspicious of the other's motives. Several diplomatic incidents undermined the agreement. The Austrians were reluctant to cede the designated territories and the Rastatt delegates could not, or would not, orchestrate the transfer of agreed upon territories to compensate the German princes for their losses. Ferdinand of Naples refused to pay tribute to France, followed by the Neapolitan rebellion, invasion by France, and the subsequent establishment of the Parthenopean Republic. Republican uprising in the Swiss cantons, encouraged by the French Republic with military support, led to the establishment of the Helvetic Republic.

Other factors contributed to the rising tensions as well. On his way to Egypt in 1798, Napoleon had stopped on the Island of Malta and forcibly removed the Hospitallers from their possessions. This angered Paul, Tsar of Russia, who was the honorary head of the Order. The French Directory, furthermore, was convinced that the Austrians were conniving to start another war. Indeed, the weaker the French Republic seemed, the more seriously the Austrians, the Neapolitans, the Russians and the English actually discussed this possibility.

== Prelude ==
Archduke Charles of Austria had taken command of the army in late January. Although he was unhappy with the strategy set forward by his brother, the Holy Roman Emperor Francis II, he had acquiesced to the less ambitious plan to which Francis and the Aulic Council had agreed: Austria would fight a defensive war and would maintain a continuous defensive line from the Danube to northern Italy. The archduke had stationed himself at Friedberg for the winter, 4.7 miles (8 km) east-south-east of Augsburg. The army was already settled into cantonments in the environs of Augsburg, extending south along the Lech river.

As winter broke in 1799, on 1 March, General Jean-Baptiste Jourdan and his army of 25,000, the so-called Army of the Danube, crossed the Rhine at Kehl. Instructed to block the Austrians from access to the Swiss alpine passes, the Army of the Danube would ostensibly isolate the armies of the Coalition in Germany from allies in northern Italy, and prevent them from assisting one another; furthermore, if the French held the interior passes in Switzerland, they could use the routes to move their own forces between the two theaters. The Army of the Danube, meeting little resistance, advanced through the Black Forest in three columns, through the Höllental (Hölle valley), via Oberkirch, and Freudenstadt, and a fourth column advanced along the north shore of the Rhine. Although Jourdan might have been better advised to establish a position on the eastern slope of the mountains, he did not. Instead, he pushed across the Danube plain and took up position between Rottweil and Tuttlingen, and eventually pushing toward the imperial city of Pfullendorf in Upper Swabia.

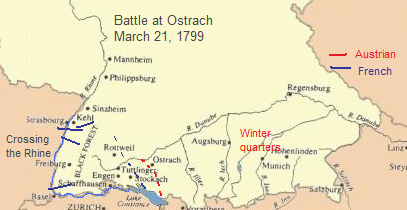
French troops wintered in France and crossed the Rhine, moving toward Ostrach in March 1799; Austrian troops wintered in Bavaria, crossed the Lech, and approached Ostrach from the east.

News of the French advance across the Rhine took three days to reach Charles at Augsburg. The Austrian Vorhut (advance guard), 17,000 men under the command of Field marshal Friedrich Joseph, Count of Nauendorf, crossed the Lech in three columns, the first at Babenhausen, marching in the direction of Biberach, the second, and strongest, at Memmingen, marching in the direction of Waldsee, and the third at Leutkirch, heading in the direction of Ravensburg. The main force of 53,000 men, under the command of the Archduke, crossed the Lech by Augsburg, Landsberg and Schongau, and six battalions of 6,600 men crossed the Danube at Ulm. An additional force of 13,000 troops under the command of Lieutenant Field Marshal Anton Sztáray marched toward Neumarkt in the direction of Rednitz. Eventually, 10,000 men under the command of General Friedrich Freiherr von Hotze marched north from Feldkirch in Switzerland, but they did not arrive in time to participate at either the battle at Ostrach, or for the subsequent battle at Stockach.

=== Locale ===
Ostrach was a small village, with a population of 300. The village belonged to the Cistercian Imperial Abbey of Salem, an influential and wealthy ecclesiastical territory on Lake Constance. The village was largely dedicated to farming, although a stretch of the imperial post road connected it and Pfullendorf. A wide, flat plain, marshy in places, stretched between the base of the Pfullendorf heights and the village; low lying hills ringed the valley, which was creased by a small stream from which the village takes its name. Ostrach itself lies almost at the northern end of this plain, but slightly south of the Danube itself. The two armies faced each other across this small and, at that time of that year, very soggy valley.

=== Dispositions ===
By 7 March, the first Austrian soldiers arrived in Ostrach. The French advance guard arrived by the 9th, under command of General François Joseph Lefebvre; in the forward line, the 25th Demi-brigade and Light Infantry positioned themselves between Ostrach and Hoßkirch; Lefebvre also had three battalions each of the 53rd and 67th Demi-Brigades of light infantry, twenty squadrons of hussars, chasseurs, and dragoons, and field artillery pieces. By 12 March, the village and the surrounding farms were filled with Lancers (Ulanen) and Hussars (Hussaren) and by the 17th, the Austrian advance guard had established forward posts at Buchau, Altshausen and Waldsee. The remainder of Charles' army, at this point nearly 110,000 strong, had established itself along a line from Ulm to Lake Constance.

By 18 March, Jourdan had formed his headquarters at Pfullendorf, on the heights above Ostrach. In front of him stood the largest part of his cavalry and half of his infantry. The center, including the 4th Regiment of Hussars, the 1st of Chasseurs à Cheval, and two squadrons of the 17th Dragoons, lay behind Ostrach, under command of General Klein. Jourdan distributed them in three columns, the strongest on the post road by Saulgau, another on the road in the direction of Altshausen, and a third at the hamlet of Friedberg.

The flank of Lefebvre's division, with 7,000 men, commanded by Laurent Saint-Cyr extended to the Danube; by the time skirmishing began, Vandamme, was still in the environs of Stuttgart, with 3,000 men, looking in vain for Austrian forces that might be stationed there, and he played no part in the battle. The far right, under command of Ferino, angled south from Pfullendorf to Lake Constance, or the Bodensee. The cavalry reserve of 3,000 under General Jean-Joseph Ange d'Hautpoul included a battalion of the 53rd Demi-Brigade, and waited in close column in the environs of Pfullendorf.

== Battle ==
Jourdan considered his position superior to the Austrian's, protected as he was by the marshy plain between his positions and the Austrian front, and he thought he had another three days to consolidate his positions. His forces occupied Hoßkirch, and a couple of other points he considered strategic: the causeway (post road) that passed Saulgau (today Bad Saulgau), the village of Altshausen 11 kilometers (7 mi) east, and the hamlet of Friedberg, 5 kilometers (3 mi) to the north-north-east of Ostrach. These positions created a perimeter around Ostrach. He was unaware that the Archduke had arrived by forced marches from Augsburg to the vicinity of Ostrach; Jourdan thought the main force of Charles' army was still at least three days' march away. By the middle of Holy Week in 1799, more than a third of Charles' army, 48,000 mixed troops, was positioned in a formation parallel to Jourdan's, and his 72,000 remaining troops were arrayed with the left wing at Kempten, the center near Memmingen, and the right flank extended to Ulm.

=== Skirmishing ===
As the armies assembled in their positions, the flanks and forward outposts encountered one another in several skirmishes; indeed, they had been skirmishing for seven days, until 19 March, when the outposts of both armies nearly overlapped. On the right wing, General Ferino's men encountered an Austrian column of volunteer infantry and some light cavalry from one of the border Hussar regiments, and took 70 and 80 prisoners, respectively, including several officers. All of this happened without the Austrians knowing that there was an official declaration of war. On 20 March, a French emissary arrived at camp of Prince Schwarzenberg, a major general commanding a brigade of the advanced guard. The emissary asked if he possessed a declaration of war from Vienna, and upon being informed that Schwarzenberg had received no such declaration, informed him that the armistice established at Campo Formio was ended, and there existed between France and Austria a state of war. General Jourdan reportedly began a general attack when the emissary left, although other sources do not bear out the scale of the attack.

Ostrach and the nearby villages.

Initially, the strength of the French advance guard pushed the most forward of the Austrian right to Saulgau and Ratzenreute, 6.2 kilometers (4 mi) east of Ostrach, backing the Austrian main army against the Schussen river. Jean Victor Tharreau's mixed brigade of infantry, light infantry and cavalry encountered the Austrians at Barendorf, and forced them to give up the ground; immediately, Charles sent reinforcements, and the Austrians regained what they had lost.

At the center of the French line, at Hoßkirch, 3 kilometers (2 mi) east-south-east of Ostrach, General Lefebvre's column attacked the Austrians in an action that lasted most of the day. The Austrian line included several seasoned Grenzer (border) regiments, the Vecsy Hussars, and some lancers; although Lefebvre's initial assault caused confusion in the Austrian ranks, the Lancers counter-attacked with ferocity and, joined by the Grenzers and the Hussars, pursued the French along the Ostrach river valley, and cut up four squadrons of the 8th Regiment of Chasseurs à Cheval. Lefebvre's column was forced out of the hamlet by the Austrians, who had four battalions, 1200 horse, and six cannons. After bringing up additional reinforcements—several light artillery, Chasseurs à Cheval, Hussars, and the 17th Regiment of Dragoons, Lefebvre was able to take the village again. By 0500 of 21 March, however, he sent word to Jourdan that he was being attacked on all posts by the Austrians, and they must soon expect a general engagement.

=== General engagement ===
Charles had divided his force into columns, and at close to 1000, the Austrians attacked in force, with simultaneous assaults upon multiple positions. With Nauendorf's advance force moved with 11 battalions and 20 squadrons on Saint Cyr's position . Following behind with the main force of the right column, Fürstenberg had little difficulty pushing the French out of Davidsweiler and advanced on Ruppersweiler an Einhard 5 kilometers (3 mi) to the northwest. His force pressured elements of Saint Cyr's thinly manned line, and the entire line fell back slowly, to maintain contact with its flanks. Maximilian, Count of Merveldt's force, attacking on Saint Cyr's far left flank, continued to pressure the line, which started to crumble. Further south, Olivier, Count of Wallis took a column of 18 battalions and 42 squadrons and attacked the Adjutant General François-Xavier Octavie Fontaine's French line at Riedhausen, between Ostrach and Ferino's column at Salem. In the maneuvering, the cross-fire trapped French forces; at Riedhausen, unable to take cover, they were cut down from both sides.

Charles himself took a main column along the high road, a causeway that passed by Saulgau, to attack Lefebvre on points between Hoßkirch and Ostrach. In this deployment of his force, Charles sought to dislodge the center of the French line from its position in Ostrach, separating the wings from the main body of force and overcoming both separately.

The convergence of the two columns on the French at Ostrach demonstrated the advantage of the superiority of Austrian numbers. From every angle, the Austrians threatened to overwhelm the French. Jourdan wrote that his men disappeared under a cloud of red coats. Battalion after battalion of Austrians threw themselves against the French defenses. By late morning, Charles' troops pushed the French out of Hoßkirch, and into Ostrach, which the French nearly lost until Jourdan sent reinforcements. The fighting remained fierce until about 1600, when the French pulled back toward Pfullendorf, encouraged by Austrian cavalry. Once out of Ostrach, and established on the road at and around Pfullendorf, the French formed a new perimeter, reinforced by reserves of Soulham, and enjoyed the benefit of altitude from which they could fire down upon the attacking Austrians. Despite the punishing musket fire, Charles' strategy worked. The far right wing (Ferino's force), which had not been attacked yet, fell back to Salem Abbey, to maintain communication with the French center.

At the Pfullendorf heights, the fight began anew. Charles sent two strong columns of eight battalions each across the Ostrach stream. The French poured fire on the Austrians, who took heavy losses, but did not give up the ground. In the night, Fürstenberg broke through the French line to Einhard, flanking Jourdan's main force and cutting off Saint Cyr. Further south, Wallis threatened to do the same to Fontaine and Ferino. As darkness fell, so ended the first day of fighting.

=== Withdrawal ===
As Jourdan was deciding whether or not to attempt another foray, the fog lifted and revealed the scene below him. He wrote later,

"... [W]e discovered an immense line of cavalry and infantry. It may be said, without exaggeration, that the troops which engaged our advanced guard amounted to twenty-five thousand men. I now perceived the absolute impossibility of making any further resistance against such a superior force, as well as the danger that threatened the division, from the advantage which the enemy had gained on the left. I therefore ordered General Soult to fall back with the division to the post before Pfulendorf [sic]."

He was wrong; the Austrians engaged with the French advance guard numbered closer to 50,000, and constituted the main body of Charles' army, not its advance guard. In the night, Charles also had moved additional troops to renew the attack on the Pfullendorf heights at daybreak.

On 21 March, at 2200, Jourdan ordered the wounded to be transported to Schaffhausen in Switzerland, via Stockach. The main army then began its own retreat in the early morning of 22 March. The reserve division of d'Hautpoul left first, and pulled back via Stockach to Emmingen ob Egg. According to Jourdan, the retreat occurred in perfect order, and was supported in particular by a company of sappers, who blew up the bridges in the face of enemy fire, and then fought like grenadiers. The Austrians outflanked Saint Cyr's forces on the right flank and General Ferino, at the southernmost point, retreated to Salem, to maintain the line with the remainder of the French force. When the first division pulled back to Bodman, on the northern tip of the Überlingen-finger of Lake Constance, a portion of the force was encircled and cut off by the 2nd Lancers of Karl Philipp, Prince Schwarzenberg's brigade, and more than 500 were taken prisoner.

Other sources are less sanguine in their assessment of Jourdan's retreat. Jourdan's forces, especially his left flank, were severely pressed; the French line collapsed upon itself at both ends as the soldiers fell back. A dispatch to Paris, later reported in the Times, claimed that the French intent had been betrayed to the Austrians by a deserter, but there is some evidence that this was Jourdan's mendacious attempt to explain the apparent surprise with which the Austrians attacked. A British report claimed that the French commander had two horses shot from under him, but Jourdan himself reported that only one horse was shot, and he was thrown, stunned, to the ground. Lefebvre received a musket ball in the wrist and had to be carried from the field; command of his division was given to the rising star Jean-de-Dieu Soult. Furthermore, a sizable portion—sources are not clear on how many—of the French right wing (Ferino's force) had been cut off from its main force, and made prisoner. Finally, General Friedrich Freiherr von Hotze was quickly making his way north with 10,000 men from Feldkirch and prepared to attack Jourdan's army from the south.

== Aftermath ==
Eventually, Jourdan withdrew first to Meßkirch (sometimes spelled Messkirch or Mößkirch), and when that city was no longer defensible, fell back to Stockach, and then again Engen, but he wrote that the armies had been well-matched; French valor, he wrote, overcame servitude. His men had taken many Austrian prisoners, and he knew also that many Austrians lay dead or wounded on the field of battle. His army itself had losses, but their valor in death matched the ambitious tyranny of the Austrians: Charles had driven his army hard, he wrote, and the Austrians would not pursue the gallant, liberty-loving French; Charles' failure to pursue the French affirmed Jourdan's perception that his had not been a defeat followed by retreat, but rather a strategic withdrawal. Jourdan probably did not know that Charles had been ordered to maintain a continuous and orderly defensive line with troops to the south.

Jourdan's own assessment did not match that of his superiors in Paris, who recognized that the loss of twelve percent of the fighting force, versus less than four percent for the adversary, did not amount to a draw. Furthermore, this first attempt to cut the Austrians off from access to the upper Rhine and Lake Constance had not succeeded. There were other considerations, primarily that Jourdan simply did not have enough men to fight not only this battle but the subsequent ones as well.

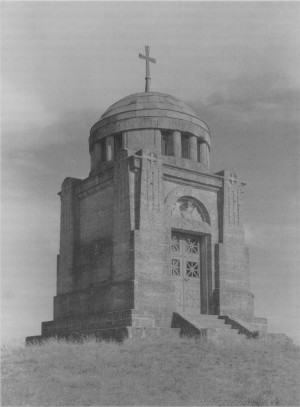
Located at 47°57′19.9″N 9°23′18″E The architect of the monument was the Hohenzollern state conservator, Wilhelm Friedrich Laur.

For his own part, the Archduke did not push his troops to pursue and capture the enemy, or even harass their retreat. Charles' slow pursuit might have been due to his own disgruntlement with Vienna's overarching defensive strategy and the undoubted difficulty of the battle itself, conducted with troops wearied by a forced march of 30 miles (48 km), fighting in rain, fog, and on normally boggy terrain made more soggy by the heavy spring rains and snow melt. Regardless, he more than made up for these shortcomings within the week. Five days after Jourdan's departure from Ostrach and Pfullendorf, the French and Austrian armies continued the fight at Stockach. This time, the decision could not be argued: The Army of the Danube could not hold the territory and withdrew into the Black Forest.

The battle at Ostrach had been difficult, as Jourdan pointed out, due largely to the dense fog and terrible weather that hampered his observation of his enemy's movements, yet the same fog that blinded him to the Austrian movements did not seem to hamper Charles. The fog and rainy weather did play a role, however. On a local level, in the damp night of the 20th, which was Gründonnerstag, (German: Green Thursday, or Maundy Thursday), the Danube overflowed, backing up into the Ostrach, and causing it to burst its own banks. The flood trapped 300 civilians between the two armies intent on destruction; suspecting what was to come, Ostrachers huddled in their cellars, and hoped for the best and gasping for breath as the battle thundered overhead. Amazingly, none were killed, although they spent Easter Sunday caring for the wounded, and helping to bury the 4,000 or so soldiers who died in the battle.

== Battle monument ==
Prior to 1903, a simple wooden cross commemorated the battle site, located on the so-called Buchbuhl, a hill overlooking the village, and the plains to the southeast, where much of the fighting occurred. In 1903, a monument was erected to honor the battle. In 1945, when French troops arrived in the region, they closed the monument; the local pastor encouraged them to reopen it, calling it a chapel.

== Sources ==
=== Books and journals ===
- Alison, Sir Archibald. A History of Europe from the Commencement of the French Revolution in 1789 to the Restoration of the Bourbons. New York: A.S. Barnes, 1850.
- Blanning, Timothy. The French Revolutionary Wars. New York: Oxford University Press, 1996. ISBN 0-340-56911-5.
- Clausewitz, Carl von (2020). Napoleon Absent, Coalition Ascendant: The 1799 Campaign in Italy and Switzerland, Volume 1. Trans and ed. Nicholas Murray and Christopher Pringle. Lawrence, Kansas: University Press of Kansas. ISBN 978-0-7006-3025-7
- Gallagher, John. Napoleon's enfant terrible: General Dominique Vandamme. Tulsa: University of Oklahoma Press, 2008, ISBN 978-0-8061-3875-6.
- Cust, Edward (Sir). Annals of the wars of the eighteenth century, compiled from the most authentic histories of the period. London: Mitchell's military library, 1857–1860.
- Graham, Thomas, Baron Lynedoch.(?) The History of the campaign of 1796 in Germany and Italy. London, 1797.
- Hollins, David. Austrian Commanders of the Napoleonic Wars, 1792–1815. London: Osprey, 2004.
- Jourdan, Jean-Baptiste, A Memoir of the operations of the army of the Danube under the command of General Jourdan, taken from the manuscripts of that officer, London: Debrett, 1799.
- (in German) Kessinger, Roland. '"Die Schlacht von Stockach am 25. März 1799". Zeitschrift für Militärgeschichte. Salzburg: Öst. Milizverlag, 1997–. [2006].
- Phipps, Ramsey Weston. The Armies of the First French Republic, volume 5: The armies of the Rhine in Switzerland, Holland, Italy, Egypt and the coup d'etat of Brumaire, 1797–1799, Oxford: Oxford University Press, 1939.
- Rothenberg, Gunther E., Napoleon's great adversaries: Archduke Charles and the Austrian Army 1792–1914, Stroud, Gloucestershire, Spellmount, 2007, ISBN 978-1-86227-383-2
- Smith, Digby, Napoleonic Wars Data Book: Actrions and Losses in Personnel, Colours, Standards and Artillery, 1792-1815, Stackpole, Greenhill PA, 1998, ISBN 1-85367-276-9
- Thiers, Adolphe. The history of the French revolution, New York, Appleton, 1854, v. 4.
- (in German) Weber, Edwin Ernst. Ostrach 1799 – die Schlacht, der Ort, das Gedenken, Gemeinde Ostrach website. Accessed 24 October 2009.
- Young, John, D.D., A History of the Commencement, Progress, and Termination of the Late War between Great Britain and France which continued from the first day of February 1793 to the first of October 1801. Volume 2. Edinburg: Turnbull, 1802.

=== Newspapers ===
- "Engagements Between The Grand Armies of the Archduke and General Jourdan." The Times, Friday, 5 April 1799; pg. 2; col A.
- Excerpted from the Hamburgh Mail. "Private Correspondence", Hamburgh, 2 March 1799, reported in The Times, 8 April 1799, pg. 3; col A.
- (in German) Broda, Ruth. "Schlacht von Ostrach:" jährt sich zum 210. Mal – Feier am Wochenende. Wie ein Dorf zum Kriegsschauplatz wurde. In: Südkurier vom 13. Mai 2009.

Preceded by Siege of Acre (1799)	French Revolution: Revolutionary campaigns Battle of Ostrach	Succeeded by Battle of Stockach (1799)
