= Battle of Stockach (1799) =

Battle in the War of the Second Coalition

- Part of War of the Second Coalition
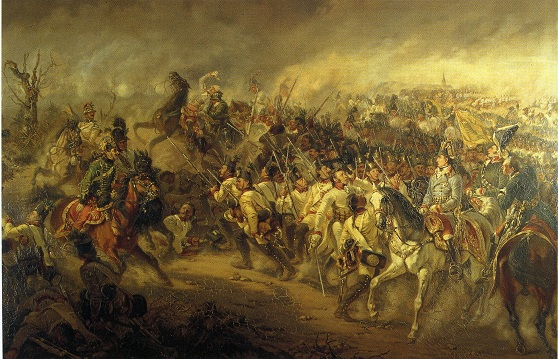
- Feldmarschall-Leutnant Karl Aloys zu Fürstenberg leading Austrian infantry during the battle of Stockach, 25 March 1799.
Date	25 March 1799
Location	Stockach, present-day Baden-Württemberg, Germany 47°51′N 9°0′E
Result	Austrian victory

Belligerents
(France) French Directory	Habsburg monarchy

Commanders and leaders
Jean-Baptiste Jourdan; Advance Guard: François Joseph Lefebvre; First Division: Pierre Marie Barthélemy Ferino; Second Division: Joseph Souham; Third Division: Laurent de Gouvion Saint-Cyr; Cavalry Reserve: Jean-Joseph Ange d'Hautpoul; Detached Flank: Dominique Vandamme	Archduke Charles; Friedrich Joseph, Count of Nauendorf; Alexander, Duke of Württemberg; Olivier, Count of Wallis; Karl Aloys zu Fürstenberg †; Nikolaus, Count of Colloredo-Mels and Wallsee; Prince Wilhelm von Anhalt-Bernburg †

Strength
26,164 infantry 7,010 cavalry 1,649 artillery 62 guns Total: 34,823	53,870 infantry 14,900 cavalry 3,565 artillery 114 guns Total: 72,335

Casualties and losses
4,000 killed, wounded or captured 1 gun lost	5,800 killed, wounded or captured 2 guns lost
- Location within Europe

War of the Second Coalition:
Austria
The color black indicates the current battle.

The Battle of Stockach occurred on 25 March 1799, when French and Austrian armies fought for control of the geographically strategic Hegau region in present-day Baden-Württemberg. (Note: There was a second battle the following year—see Second Battle of Stockach. Some older English sources refer to this as the Battle of Stochach and some French chronicles as Battle of Liptingen (or Leibtengen).) In the broader military context, this battle constitutes a keystone in the first campaign in southwestern Germany during the Wars of the Second Coalition, part of the French Revolutionary Wars.

It was the second battle between the French Army of the Danube, commanded by Jean-Baptiste Jourdan, and the Habsburg Army under Archduke Charles; the armies had met a few days earlier, 20–22 March, on the marshy fields southeast of Ostrach and the Pfullendorf heights. The Austrian Army's superior strength, almost three-to-one, forced the French to withdraw.

At Stockach, the French concentrated their forces into shorter lines, creating intense fighting conditions; initially, Charles's line was more extended, but he quickly pulled additional troops from his reserves to strengthen his front. When a small French force commanded by Dominique Vandamme nearly flanked the Austrian Army, Charles's personal intervention was crucial for the Austrians, buying time for reinforcements to arrive. General Jourdan, while trying to rally his men, was nearly trampled to death. Ultimately, the French were driven back upon the Rhine River.

== Background ==
Although the First Coalition forces achieved several initial victories at Verdun, Kaiserslautern, Neerwinden, Mainz, Amberg and Würzburg, the efforts of Napoleon Bonaparte in northern Italy pushed Austrian forces back and resulted in the negotiation of the Peace of Leoben (17 April 1797) and the subsequent Treaty of Campo Formio (October 1797). This treaty proved difficult to administer. Austria was slow to give up some of the Venetian territories. A Congress convened at Rastatt for the purposes of deciding which southwestern German states would be mediatised to compensate the dynastic houses for territorial losses, but was unable to make any progress. Supported by French republican forces, Swiss insurgents staged several uprisings, ultimately causing the overthrow of the Swiss Confederation after 18 months of civil war.

By early 1799, the French Directory had become impatient with stalling tactics employed by Austria. The uprising in Naples raised further alarms, and recent gains in Switzerland suggested the timing was fortuitous to venture on another campaign in northern Italy and southwestern Germany.

== Prelude to battle ==
As winter broke in 1799, on 1 March, General Jean Baptiste Jourdan and his army of 25,000, the so-called Army of Observation, crossed the Rhine between Basel and Kehl. This crossing officially violated the Treaty of Campo Formio. On 2 March, the Army was renamed Army of the Danube, upon orders of the French Directory.

The Army met little resistance as it advanced through the Black Forest in four columns, through the Höllental (Hölle valley), via Oberkirch, and Freudenstadt, and at the southern end of the forest, along the Rhine bank. Although prudent counsel might have advised Jourdan to establish a position on the eastern slope of the mountains, he did not; instead he pushed across the Danube plain, taking position between Rottweil and Tuttlingen.

The Austrian Army and Archduke Charles, its commander-in-chief, had wintered with his army in the Bavarian, Austrian, and Salzburg territories on the eastern side of the Lech; his force alone numbered close to 80,000 troops, and outnumbered the French force by three to one. An additional 26,000, commanded by Friedrich Freiherr von Hotze, guarded the Vorarlberg, and further south, another 46,000, under command of Count Heinrich von Bellegarde, formed the defense of the Tyrol. The Austrians had already reached an agreement with Tsar Paul of Russia by which the legendary Alexander Suvorov would leave retirement to assist Austria in Italy with another 60,000 troops.

=== Engagement at Ostrach ===
The Army of the Danube advanced on Pfullendorf and Ostrach, the former an imperial city in Upper (southern) Swabia, and the latter a nearby village of 300 belonging to the Imperial Abbey of Salem, an influential and wealthy ecclesiastical territory on Lake Constance. Jourdan's objective was simple and direct: cut the Austrian line at the border of the southwestern German states and Switzerland, preventing the Coalition's use of Switzerland as an overland route between central and southern Europe. Isolation of the two theaters would prevent the Austrians from assisting one another; furthermore, if the French held the interior passes in Switzerland, they could use these routes to move their own forces between the two theaters.

Stretching between the Pfullendorf heights and the village lies a flat, wide plain, marshy in places, ringed with low-lying hills, and creased with a small tributary stream from which the village takes its name. Ostrach itself lies almost at the northern end of this plain, but slightly south of the Danube itself. By 7 March, the first French forces arrived there, and the Austrians arrived a day or so later. Over the following week, additional forces for both sides arrived, and the two armies faced each other across this valley.

The French army extended in a long line from the Danube to Lake Constance. The Third Division, commanded by Laurent de Gouvion Saint-Cyr, positioned itself at the far left flank, and Dominique Vandamme's detached force, returning from reconnaissance near Stuttgart, roamed on the north shore of the river. François Joseph Lefebvre commanded the Advance Guard, positioned on the slope below Pfullendorf, and Joseph Souham, with the Second Division, took position behind him. Pierre Marie Barthélemy Ferino's First Division held the southernmost flank, to defend against any encirclement by Charles' force. Jourdan set up command at Pfullendorf, and the Cavalry Reserve, commanded by Jean-Joseph Ange d'Hautpoul, stood slightly to the north and west of Souham.

By late on the 19th, Austrian and French soldiers had been skirmishing at outposts for more than 30 hours, with the action growing increasingly intense. In the early hours of the 21st, General Lefebvre informed Jourdan that the Austrians were attacking all his positions, and that the general engagement would begin shortly. After 24 hours of fighting, Austrian forces pushed Lefebvre and Saint Cyr's troops back to the Pfullendorf heights. Although sappers blew up the primary bridge over the Ostrach river, the Austrians managed to ford the stream anyway. They nearly outflanked General Saint Cyr's forces on the right flank, did outflank Lefebvre's forces in the center, and cut off a portion of the southern flank from the main body. Saint Cyr's troops barely managed to pull back before being fully cut off. Finally, General Friedrich Freiherr von Hotze, marching north with 10,000 men, from Feldkirch, threatened Ferino's First Division from the south.

=== Retreat from Ostrach ===
On 21 March, at 2200, Jourdan ordered the wounded to be transported to Schaffhausen in Switzerland, via Stockach. The main army then began its own retreat in the early morning of the 22nd. The reserve division of d'Hautpoul left first, and pulled back via Stockach to Emmengen ob Eck. The first division pulled back to Bodman, on the northern tip of the Überlingen-finger of Lake Constance; in the retreat, a portion of the force was encircled and cut off by the 2nd Lancers of Karl Philipp, Prince Schwarzenberg's brigade, and more than 500 were taken prisoner.

== Battle at Stockach and Engen ==
Fought at the junction of the east–west and north–south roads on the eastern side of the Black Forest, the day-long battle at Stockach and Engen pitted the two armies against each other for the second time in seven days. The Austrians still had the numerical superiority, but this time it was closer to two-to-one, instead of almost three-to-one. Jourdan had consolidated his force over a shorter line, and had the full Army of the Danube under his direct command. Charles, likewise, had shortened his line; although Hotze had not yet caught up with the archduke, he and his 10,000 men were approaching from the Austrians' left rear.

=== Dispositions ===
By 23 March, Jourdan had his headquarters in the vicinity of Stockach. He had recalled Barthélemy Ferino from the far right flank; Ferino had retreated along the coast of the Überlingen Lake, the northwestern finger of Lake Constance, to be in position at the close right flank, adjacent to Souham's division. Lefebvre, wounded at Ostrach, was unable to take the field himself, and Laurent Saint Cyr commanded the left flank. When Jourdan considered his position, he felt it too extended, so he drew back further behind Stockach, toward Engen, where he could concentrate his force. The first division camped near the Hohentwiel, the 11th-century fortress overlooking the marshes at the westernmost point of the Lake Constance. The second division, the advanced guard, and a cavalry division were camped on the heights above Engen. The third division was camped by Leibtengen (Liptingen, the French called it), and Neuhausen. Vandamme and his small corps worked themselves discreetly into a position behind the Austrian right flank. Jourdan established his headquarters at Engen.

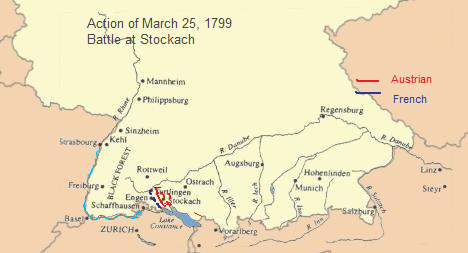
French and Austrian troops concentrated their forces in the vicinity of Stockach on 25 March 1799.

The plan was straightforward: Vandamme and Saint Cyr would make a simultaneous attack on the Austrian right, and Soult's and Jourdan's main force would attack the Austrian center and left. Jourdan's plan, to attack four points of the opposition simultaneously, seemed to him to be the only reasonable action against a force with such numerical superiority.

The Habsburg center columns included 17,000 men under the command of field marshal Friedrich Joseph, Count of Nauendorf, formed into three columns and approaching from the north east. The main force, under the command of the Archduke Charles, included 53,000 men, also in three columns; in the main force, Charles had under his command the princes of Anhalt and Fürstenberg plus six battalions in a fourth column, north of the main column, but south of Nauendorf's command. An additional force of 13,000 troops under the command of Lieutenant Field Marshal Anton Count Sztáray formed the southern flank.

=== General engagement ===
The general engagement on 25 March was brutal and bloody. Before daybreak, at close to 0500, Saint Cyr opened by sending his forces in a headlong attack on the Austrian right, coordinated with Souham and Ferino's assault on the Austrian left. The ferocious attack forced the Austrians out of the woods in which they had been positioned overnight, and down the road to the village of Schwandorf. Fearing that his forces would be flanked, Charles directed some reinforcements to back up General Mervelt's force on the Austrian right, six squadrons of lancers of the First Regiment. At this point, Vandamme's small corps, which had moved into position in the night of 24 March, attacked from the rear. Saint Cyr's forces had taken hold of the woods outside Stockach, named by the Austrians as the gruesome wood, with the conflict there described as "obstinate and bloody." The Archduke himself arrived with six battalions of Hungarian grenadiers and twelve squadrons of cuirassiers and led them into the fight. His grenadiers, experienced and battle-hardened, objected to his exposure and one actually grabbed the bridle of Charles' horse, to stop him. As the archduke prepared to dismount and lead his men on foot, Karl Aloys zu Fürstenberg stepped forward to volunteer, reportedly stating that he would die first, before allowing the archduke to put himself in such danger. As Karl Aloys Fürstenberg led the hussars and grenadiers into a counter-attack, he was hit by French case shot and killed. Archduke Charles eventually did lead his grenadiers, and the French momentum was not only arrested, but reversed. The Prince of Anhalt was also killed in the battle. Saint Cyr made no progress until Vandamme's assault, but both withered under the Archduke's response. In the melee, Claude Juste Alexandre Legrand, a general of brigade of Saint Cyr's III. Division, lost both his brother at his side, and his aide-de-camp, and Jourdan himself had barely escaped being trampled to death or captured, as he tried to rally his own troops. The superior number of Austrians stalled the main French assault on the Habsburg center.

At the French right flank, General Ferino attempted to push the Austrians back, first with a cannonade, followed by an attack through the woods on both sides of the road between Asch and Stockach. Two columns made two attacks, both of which were repulsed; finally, Ferino added his third column to the assault, which resulted in the Austrian reformation of the line, cannons at the center firing a heavy cannonade. Ferino could not respond because he had run out of artillery ammunition. The French fixed bayonets and charged the village of Wahlwies, successfully taking it, but they were unable to hold it in the night, and subsequently fell back.

== Aftermath ==
=== Withdrawal ===
On the evening of 26 March, Jourdan arranged for the abandonment of the positions in Engen and Stockach. Saint Cyr had already withdrawn along the Danube, after his and Vandamme's assaults on the Austrian right failed, and was working his way west toward the Black Forest. Inexplicably, at least at the time, the Austrians failed to pursue the retreating French; instead of pursuing the French, Charles ordered his army into cantonments at Stockach and Engen, as far south as Wahlweiss. The Aulic Council, in establishing a plan of battle, had forbidden his approach to the Rhine until Switzerland was also cleared of the French army; Charles simply held his ground.

By 31 March, the Army of the Danube established itself in Neustadt, Freiburg im Breisgau, Freudenstadt and Schiltach. Jourdan set up his command headquarters at Hornberg. The cavalry could not find enough forage in the mountains, and were sent to Offenburg.

== Interpretation ==
Jourdan later claimed that the Austrians had lost 7,000 killed or wounded, plus another 4,000 prisoners, and several cannons. For the whole day of the general engagement, the French had remained on the field of battle without meat, bread or brandy, and their animals had been without forage: "it is impossible to deny," Jourdan wrote later, "without the most glaring injustice or falsehood, that we gained a victory." Both sides claimed a victory, but most 19th- and 20th-century historians granted it to the Austrian force.

The French Directory did as well. In mid April, suffering from a nephritic complaint, Jourdan handed over command to his chief of staff, general of division Jean Augustin Ernouf, and returned to Paris to complain about the lack of men, the inexperience of the men he had, their supplies, and the size, experience, and supply of the army he had to face. He found little sympathy there, and when he told the Directory that he was ill, tendering his resignation, it was accepted.

From exile on Elba fifteen years later, Napoleon analyzed the Battle of Stockach and the French defeat: its cause, he concluded, lay in Jourdan's division of force. Although Jourdan had increased concentration from his dispositions at Ostrach, the French force was still over-extended. Against a more concentrated force, the Austrians could not have moved troops from the left to reinforce the right flank when Saint Cyr and Vandamme attacked from front and rear. Furthermore, Napoleon averred, Ferino's force on the French right had not been concentrated sufficiently and d'Hautpoul's cavalry assault had taken too long to materialize, giving the Austrians the upper hand. The Austrian left had halted his assault, freeing men from the southern flank to reinforce the northern one. Importantly, the Austrian line was short enough that troops could move quickly from the southern flank to the northern one. Furthermore, Napoleon argued, Jourdan had retreated north-northwest, to the Black Forest to protect Alsace. He should have retreated south, to join with André Masséna's well-positioned Army of Helvetia, where in combination the Army of Helvetia and the Army of the Danube could have combined forces to defeat the Habsburg army. With Jourdan's misguided overall strategy, Napoleon asserted, the French snatched defeat from the jaws of victory.

== Notes ==
Preceded by Battle of Ostrach	French Revolution: Revolutionary campaigns Battle of Stockach (1799)	Succeeded by Battle of Magnano
