= Siege of Sélestat =

- Part of Franco-Prussian War
Date	20 – 24 October 1870
Location	Sélestat, Bas-Rhin, France 48°15′34″N 7°27′15″E
Result	German Victory

Belligerents
French Republic	North German Confederation; Prussia; Bavaria; Baden

Commanders and leaders
De Reinach de Foussemagne	Hermann von Schmeling

Strength
Over 4,000 Infantry (mainly Garde Mobile soldiers ), 120 artillery pieces	The battalions of the Regiment LANDWEHR No. 1, No. 3, No. 4, No. 5, No. 43 and 45, Rhine Regiment No. 25 and many other forces

Casualties and losses
2,000–2,400 people were arrested, 120 cannon fire, 7,000 weapons, artillery and seized stocks	20 Infantry

The siege of Sélestat was a siege, extending from 20 to 24 October 1870, of the French Alsatian fortress of Sélestat, during the Franco-Prussian War. After artillery bombardment by the Germans, the siege ended when the French army surrendered, mainly because the French garrison was demoralized. The Germans suffered only minor losses, while this victory brought them many spoils.

== History ==
=== Background ===
The task of capturing Sélestat and Neu-Breisach was assigned to the newly formed 4th Reserve Division under the command of General Wilhelm von Schmeling. At Sélestat, the French army garrison of troops consisted mainly of soldiers of the Garde Mobile. When the Germans were unable to quickly force the surrender of the French forces at Neu-Breisach, Von Schmeling focused on besieging Sélestat.

=== Siege ===
During the siege, De Reinach de Foussemagne was in charge of defending Sélestat. The resistance there was modest when the German army's 4th Reserve Division, under Von Schmeling, which consisted of forces of the Kingdom of Prussia, Kingdom of Bavaria, and the Grand Duchy of Baden.

After De Reinach de Foussemagne declined to surrender, the German Army gradually brought in the materiel needed for a siege (e.g. artillery) and strengthened its positions. German shelling began during the night of 19 October and continued the following day. During the night of 21 October 1870, the infantry advanced about 400 paces up the gentle slope in front of the fortress. The German army then began construction of its first trench, located opposite the Colmar gate, placing several dozen cannon to the rear. The resistance of the French garrison during the following night diminished.

=== French surrender ===
On 22 October a fierce artillery battle broke out. The town was in ruins in several places, and eventually the French artillery exhausted its ammunition. That night, the German batteries continued their artillery attack. In addition, German forces built a second trench. On the morning of 24 October, the French raised a white flag. That afternoon, the French surrender was arranged, and De Reinach de Foussemagne asked the Germans to move in and take over the town, which was in turmoil because of drunken French soldiers. The German forces restored order, and the French garrison became German prisoners of war. Von Schmeling entered the town the next day, amid the ringing of church bells.

=== Aftermath ===
The German victory in the Siege of Strasbourg enabled them to capture fortresses such as Sélestat, Neu-Breisach, Mortier, Belfort as well as Lower Alsace. The fall of Sélestat (a few days before Metz), along with Soissons, Verdun, Neu-Breisach, was part of a series of victories by German forces over a few weeks' time.

Von Schmeling carried out a vigorous siege of Breisach, which surrendered in early November 1870.
