= Avolsheim =

- Commune
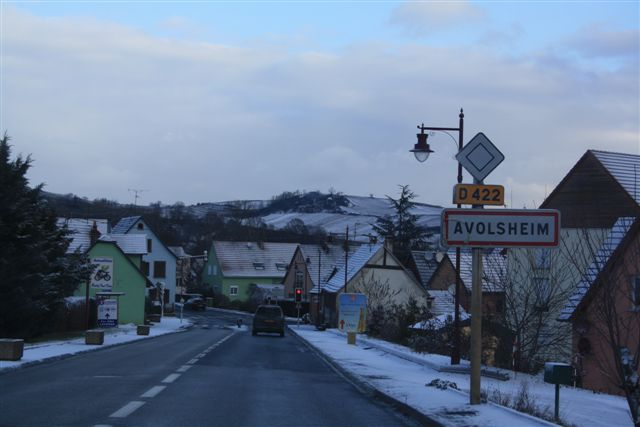
- Avolsheim in winter

- Coat of arms
- Location of Avolsheim
- Location within France Location within Grand Est
- Coordinates: 48°33′44″N 7°30′07″E
- Country: France
- Region: Grand Est
- Department: Bas-Rhin
- Arrondissement: Molsheim
- Canton: Molsheim
- Intercommunality: CC Région Molsheim-Mutzig

Government
  - Mayor (2020–2026): Pascal Géhin
- Area^{1}: 1.83 km^{2} (0.71 sq mi)
- Highest elevation: 362 m (1,188 ft)
- Lowest elevation: 164 m (538 ft)
- Population (2023): 745
  - Density: 407/km^{2} (1,050/sq mi)
- Time zone: UTC+01:00 (CET)
  - Summer (DST): UTC+02:00 (CEST)
- INSEE/Postal code: 67016 /67120
- ^{1} French Land Register data, which excludes lakes, ponds, glaciers > 1 km^{2} (0.386 sq mi or 247 acres) and river estuaries.

Avolsheim (French pronunciation: [avɔlsaim]) is a commune in the Bas-Rhin department in the Grand Est region of north-eastern France.

The commune has been awarded one flower by the National Council of Towns and Villages in Bloom in the Competition of cities and villages in Bloom.

== Geography ==
Avolsheim is located some 22 km west by south-west of Strasbourg and 18 km north of Obernai. Access to the commune is by the D422 from Odratzheim in the north which passes through the centre of the commune and the town and continues south to Molsheim. The D127 goes east from the town to Dachstein. Apart from the significant sized urban area the commune is mixed forest and farmland.

The Bruche river flows north through the east of the commune and abruptly turns right near the northern border of the commune before continuing east to join a branch of the Rhine at Strasbourg. The Mossig river flows from the north-west forming the northern border of the commune before joining the Bruche.

== Toponymy ==
The first written record of the name of a village in the current commune dates from the year 788 and is called Hunzolfesheim. It was found in 1051 spelled Avelsheim then Afelsheim in 1350 with a dialectal form Âfelse. In 1496 it was written Afeltzheim and in 1589 Avelssheim again but with two "s". Since then, the village has had its present name and its spelling has not changed.

The prefix offe (offen in German = "open") was the origin of the name Avolsheim and therefore means "Open Town". It is possible that this name was given to the village since it was devoid of walls, which in the Middle Ages was relatively rare.

There is an old local saying in dialect: Es steht offe wie Âfelse ("It is as open as Avolsheim") suggesting that at one time the steeple at Avolsheim, which remained so long in ruins so was "open to the sky", that this could have been the origin of its name. This argument, with the previous one, are confirmed by the popular phrase, Fescht wie Landau un Offe wie Âfelse meaning "A Fort (or fortified) like Landau or open like Avolsheim".

== History ==
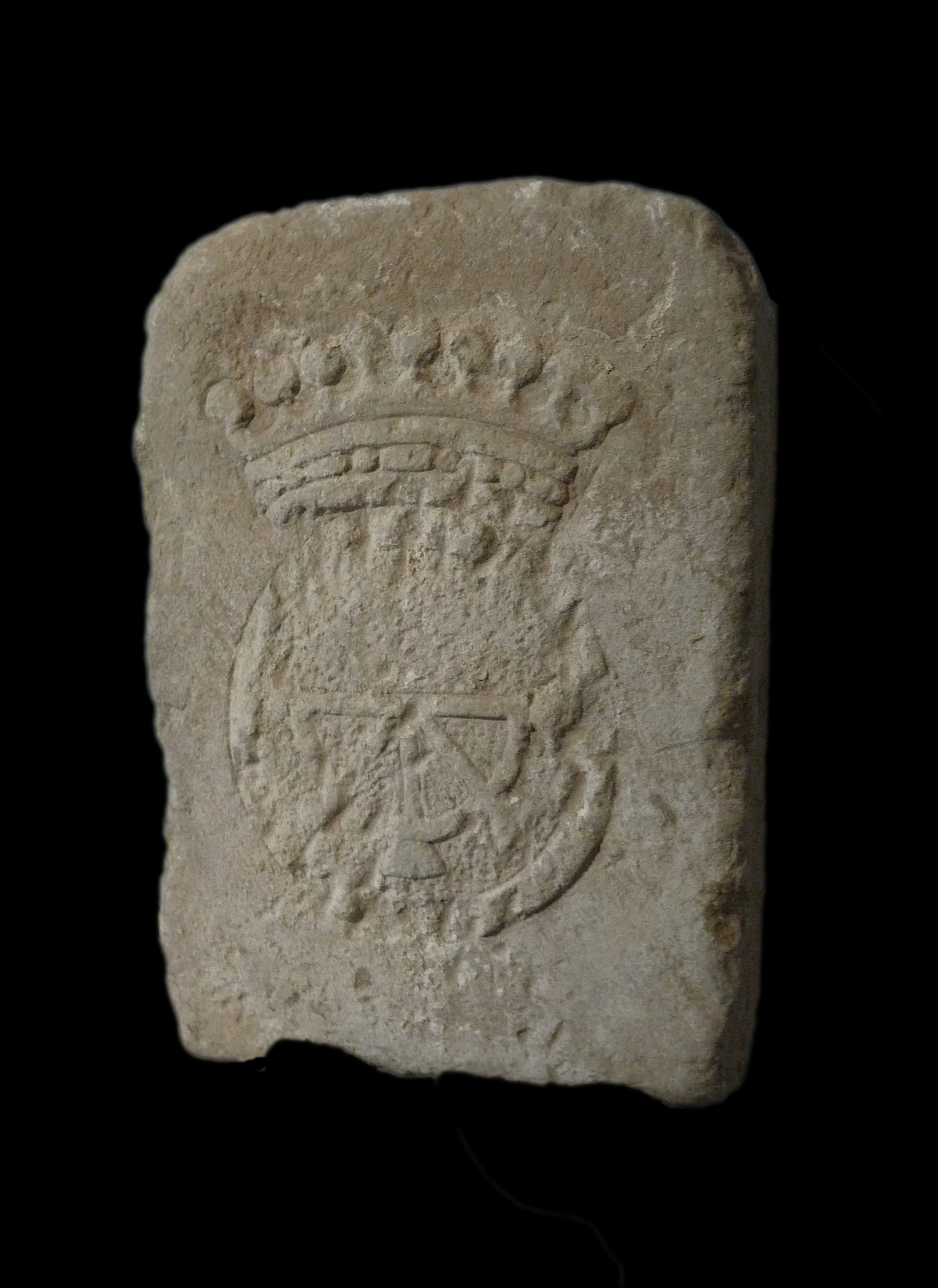
Milestone limiting the ban of Avolsheim

=== Until the Revolution ===
Avolsheim is located on the Gallo-Roman road linking Molsheim to Saverne. Many objects dating from this period were excavated in 1930.

In the 10th century the area had two distinct hamlets: Avelsheim one hand, corresponding roughly to the current village, and Tumpfieter, Dompieter, or Domphietenheim, a village consisting of a group of a few farms and a mill located at a church called the Dompeter.

The last mention of this hamlet was in the 16th century. It probably died as a village by the end of the same century. For some historians doubt remains: it may have disappeared in the 17th century, its destruction following the Siege of Dachstein by the armies of Turenne.

According to the papal bull of Leo IX in 1051 Avolsheim, including the Mont Sainte-Odile Abbey, was part of the possessions of the bishopric of Strasbourg.

Avolsheim was put in vassalage to the Counts of Ostoffen, then to von Murnhart in 1384, and finally remained with von Beger until 1521. From 1534 until the Revolution, the area was a fief of the dignitaries of the diocese.

=== Since the French Revolution ===
The village has been linked to the sub-prefecture of Molsheim since the Revolution.

Avolsheim was once on the Sélestat to Saverne railway line before the section from Molsheim to Saverne was removed in 1967 and replaced with a bicycle path.

=== Heraldry ===
Arms of Avolsheim	Blazon: Azure, a wheel Or of eight spokes, crowned the same, the hub and spokes in chief disappeared.

== Administration ==
List of Successive Mayors

From	To	Name
2001	2008	Gilbert Vetter
2008	2014	Gérard Gendre
2014	2020	Françoise Hauss
2020	2026	Pascal Géhin

== Demography ==
The inhabitants of the commune are known as Avolsheimois or Avolsheimoises in French.

Historical population

Year	Pop.	±% p.a.
1793	416	—
1800	412	−0.14%
1806	486	+2.79%
1821	533	+0.62%
1831	609	+1.34%
1836	700	+2.82%
1841	661	−1.14%
1846	803	+3.97%
1851	695	−2.85%
1856	688	−0.20%
1861	696	+0.23%
1866	742	+1.29%
1871	679	−1.76%
1875	650	−1.09%
1880	632	−0.56%
1885	668	+1.11%
1890	668	+0.00%
1895	610	−1.80%
1900	569	−1.38%

Year	Pop.	±% p.a.
1905	562	−0.25%
1910	561	−0.04%
1921	522	−0.65%
1926	542	+0.75%
1931	519	−0.86%
1936	502	−0.66%
1946	474	−0.57%
1954	441	−0.90%
1962	478	+1.01%
1968	487	+0.31%
1975	513	+0.75%
1982	513	+0.00%
1990	567	+1.26%
1999	657	+1.65%
2007	763	+1.89%
2012	726	−0.99%
2017	713	−0.36%
2023	745	+0.73%

Source: EHESS and INSEE

== Culture and heritage ==
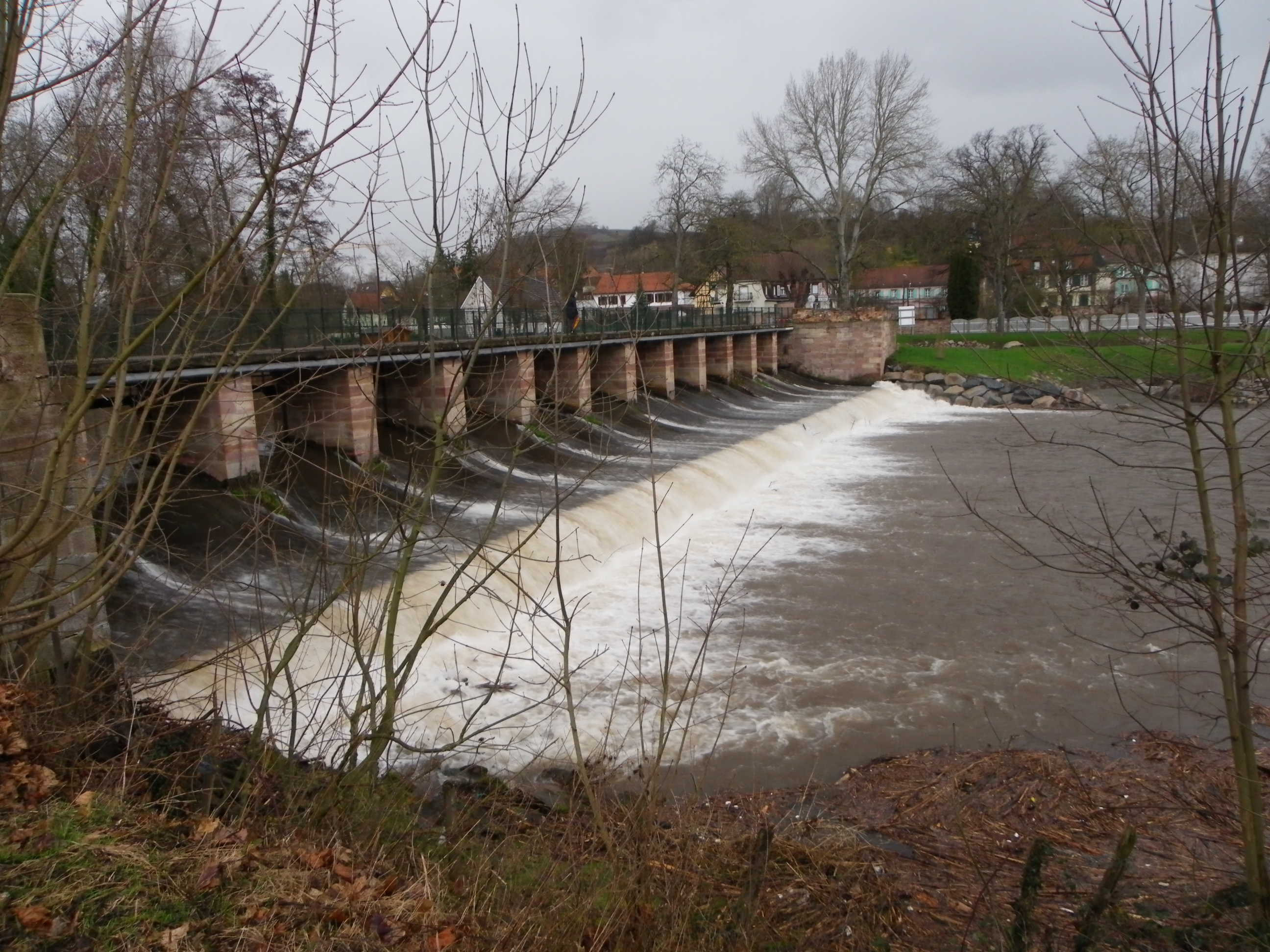
The Dam on the Bruche

=== Civil heritage ===
The commune has many buildings that are registered as historical monuments:

- A Vineyard Farmhouse at 3 Rue de la Boucherie (1548)
- A Vineyard Farmhouse at 4 Rue de Dompeter (1867)
- The Audéoud House or Maison des Soeurs at 1 place de l'Ecole (18th century)
- A Stonemason's House at 2 place de l'Ecole (1563)
- A Vineyard Farmhouse at 4 Place de l'Eglise (1788)
- A Guardhouse at 16 Rue de la Paix (19th century)
- A Vineyard Farmhouse at 2 Rue de la Paix (1819)
- A Boatman's House at 5 Rue de la Paix (1837)
- A former Presbytery now Town Hall at 8 Rue de la Paix (1889)
- A Fisherman's House at 9 Rue de la Paix (1600)
- A Stonemason's House at 2 bis Rue Saint-Ullrich (1564)
- A Farmhouse at 5 Route du Vin (1844)
- Houses and Farms

Other sites of interest

The Avolsheim Dam was built in 1682 on the Bruche Canal that was built by Vauban. This canal was used to transport blocks of sandstone to Strasbourg from quarries at Soultz-les-Bains and Wolxheim which were necessary for the construction of the Citadel of Strasbourg. This dam enabled the keeping of the water level high enough to supply the canal located a little further down.

=== Religious heritage ===
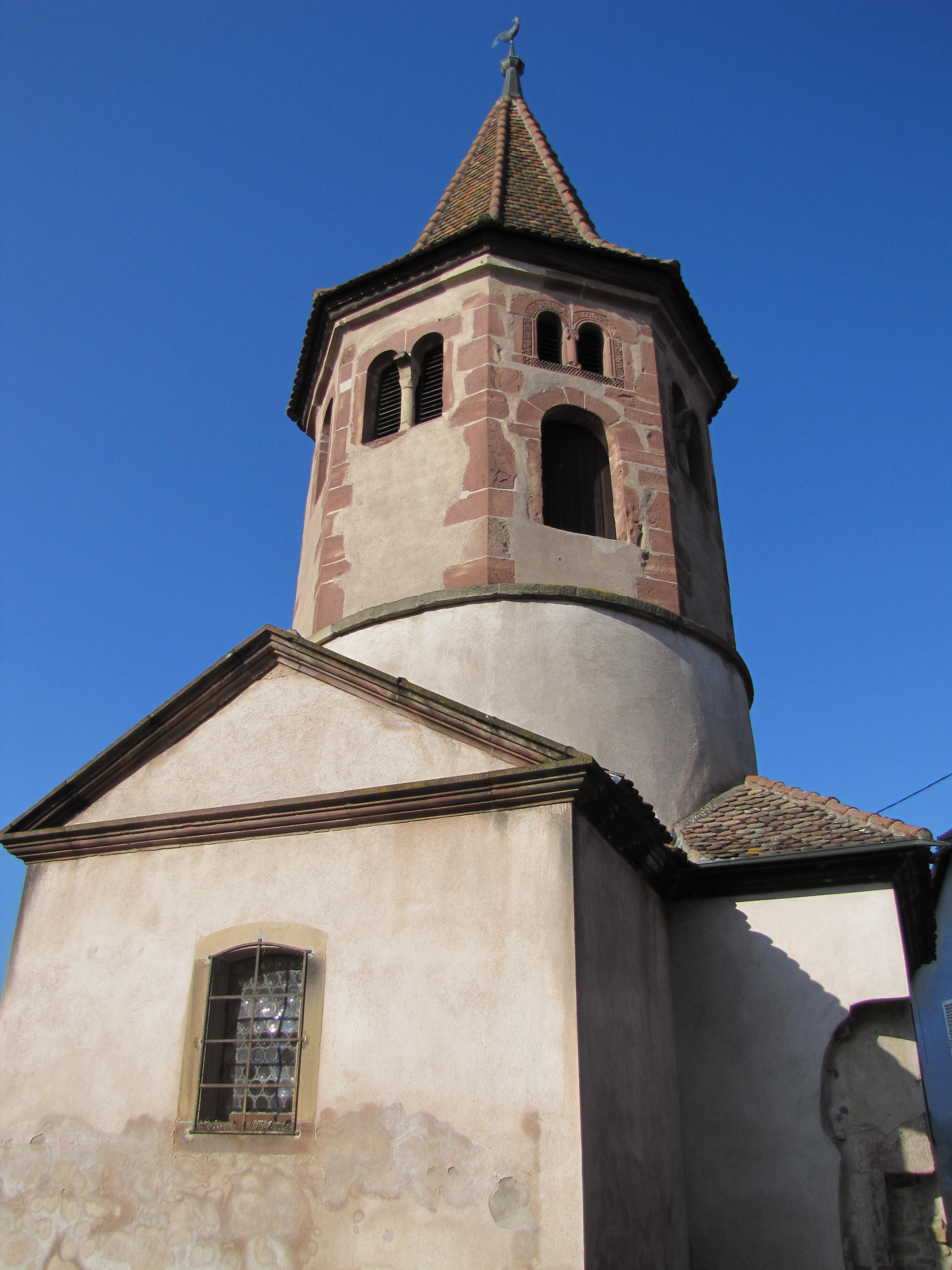
The Chapel of Saint-Ullrich

The commune has two religious buildings that are registered as historical monuments:

- The Chapel of Saint-Ullrich (10th century). The original building dates back to the 11th or end of the 10th century. In 1774 the chapel was transformed to become the new church adopting the facade that is seen today. The chapel consists of an original Tetraconch which is the oldest still existing in Alsace located along the ancient Roman road in the foothills of the Vosges. Taking the form of a clover leaf covered by a dome, the chapel is surmounted by an unusual octagonal tower. In 1774 a church was built next to the chapel to replace the Dompeter that was too far away. The church was finally demolished in 1911 because the building was too small. The central dome and mural paintings were revealed in 1968 when a layer of whitewash was removed. The chapel contains two items that are registered as historical objects:
  - A Monumental Painting (12th century)
  - An Altar (18th century)

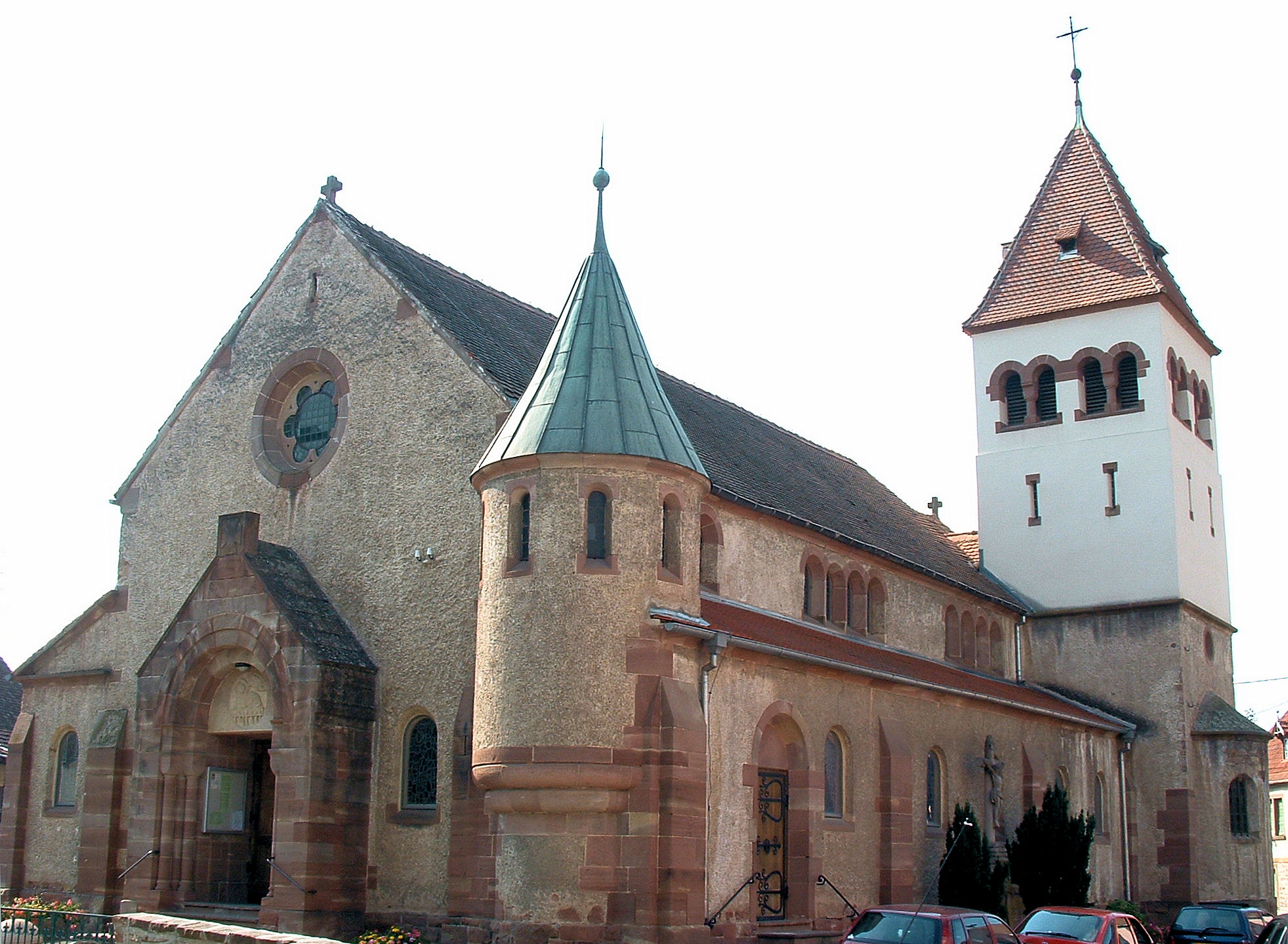
The Church of Saint-Materne

- The Parish Church of Saint-Materne (1911). The Church of Saint-Materne was built in 1911 by architect Johann Knauth who was responsible for Strasbourg Cathedral. This building is the current parish church for Avolsheim which was consecrated in 1936. It is Neo-Romanesque and consists of a nave with aisles overlooked by a barrel-vaulted choir. The bell tower over the sacristy has three which were cast for the old parish church. When construction was complete the organ, dating from 1867 and which was installed by Joseph Dompeter Stiehr, was transferred from the old Church. The church contains many items that are registered as historical objects:
  - A Statue: Virgin and child (16th century)
  - A Statue: Virgin and child (18th century)
  - A Processional Cross (15th century)
  - A Bronze Bell (1788)
  - 2 Bronze Bells (1750 and 1753)
  - An Organ (19th century)
  - A Processional Cross (2) (17th century)
  - A Processional Cross (1) (18th century)
- A number of other sites are registered as historical objects:
  - A Wayside Cross: Mount Calvary: Flagellation of Christ at Chemin Werwelweg (17th century)
  - A Wayside Cross: Climbing Mount Calvary at C.D. 121 (1856)
  - A Wayside Cross N called Bildstock (18th century)
  - A Wayside Cross: Christ on the Cross (M) at Route du Vin (1841)
  - A Wayside Cross F called Bildstock (1623)
  - A Relief: Bélier at 1 Place de l'Ecole (12th century)
  - A Wayside Cross: Christ on the Cross (H) at Route du Vin (1705)

Other religious buildings

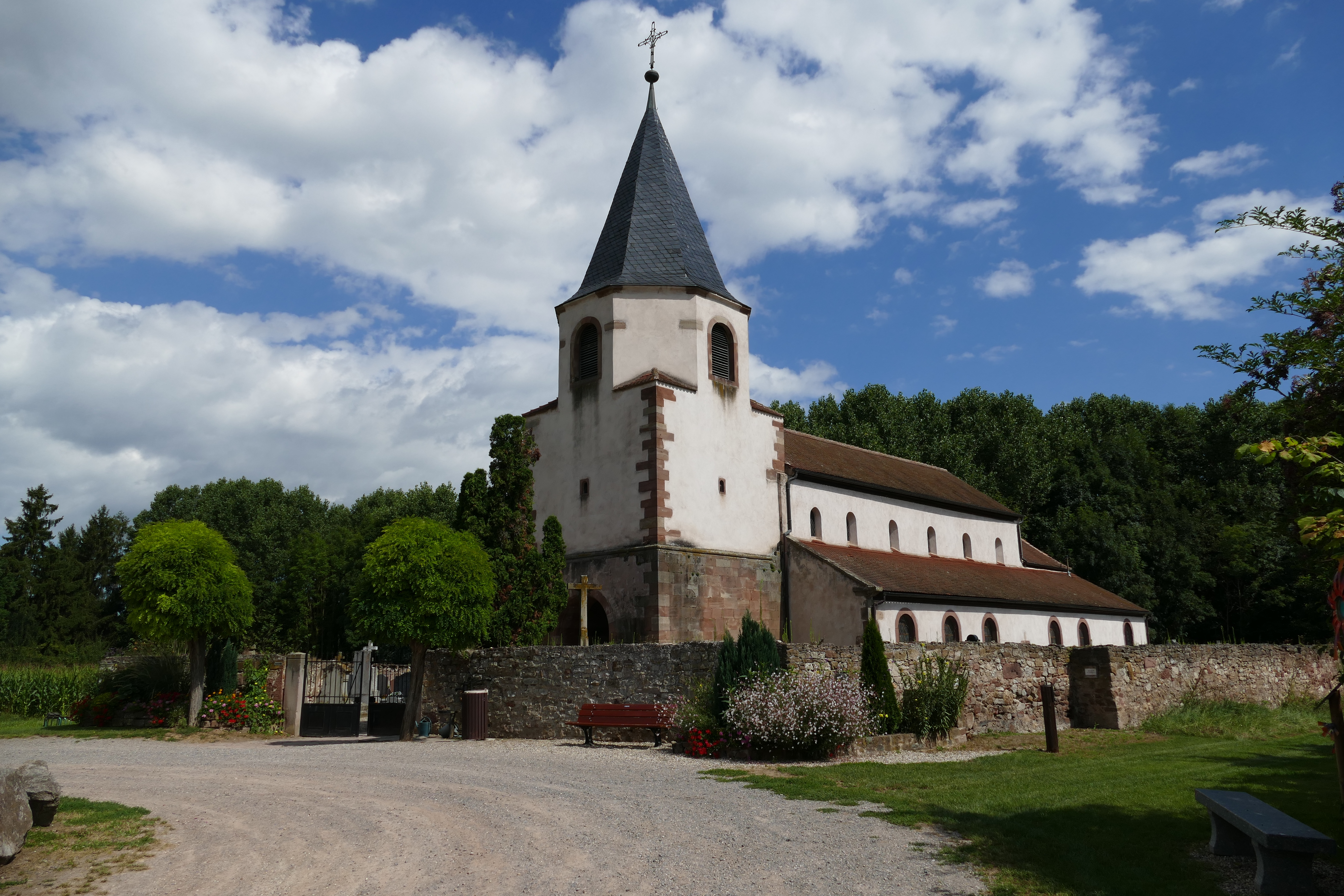
The Church of Dompeter

- The Church of Dompeter - one of the oldest churches in Alsace. This church is located in the centre of the Molsheim-Dachstein-Avolsheim triangle. Dedicated to Saint Peter by Materne, its exact age is not known but it is certain that Pope Leo IX consecrated the Dompeter around 1050. The name of the place comes from the Latin Domus Petri (stone house) although there is no trace of the primitive shrine which, according to legend, dates back to the beginning of Christianity. Excavations in 1914 revealed that the foundations on which the Dompeter is made date from Merovingian times. The various changes it has undergone have preserved traces of the era when the changes were done. It is an architectural wealth that allows the observation of the styles of different eras in one place: its bell tower is a perfect example. In 1767 the tower was partially destroyed in a fire. The destroyed part was replaced by an octagonal floor with a spire. After the abandonment of the building between the two wars, the Scouts have done some work in order to ensure its preservation. On the plaques which decorate the walls of the choir are engraved the names of the Scouts of Alsace who died during the Second World War. The church has one item that is registered as an historical object:
  - 2 Statues: Saint Catherine and Saint Apolline (18th century)
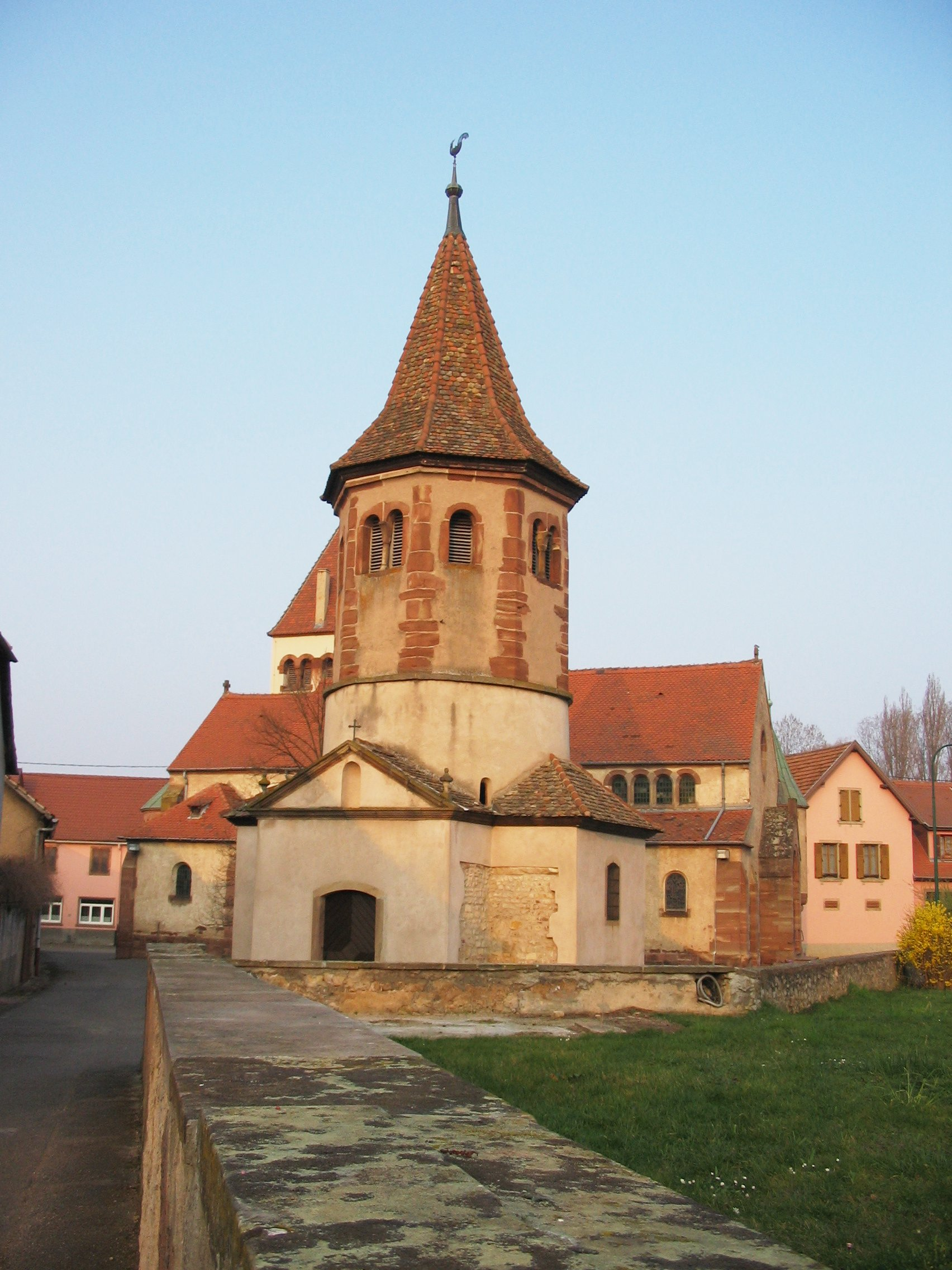
Chapel of Saint-Ulrich

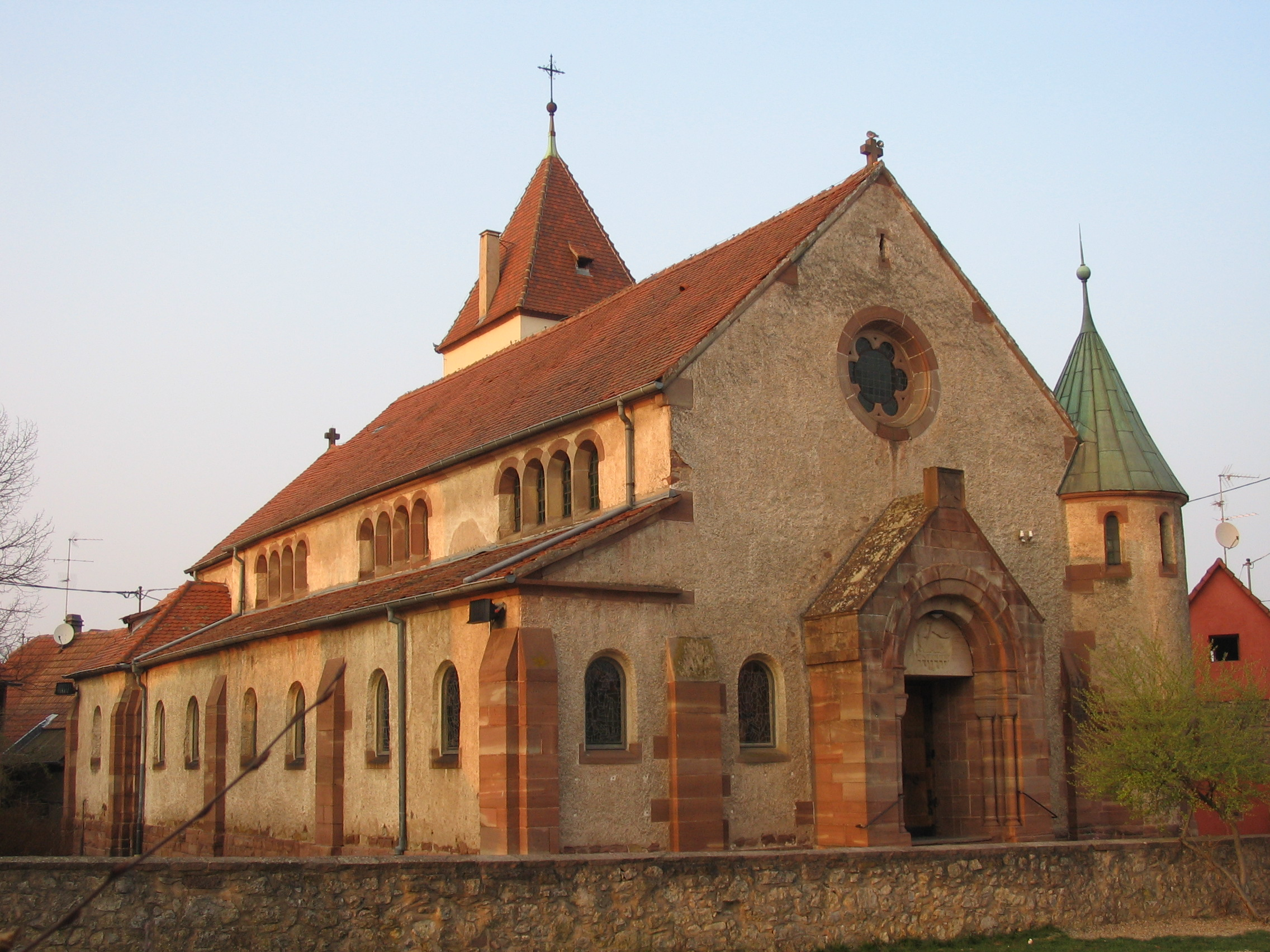
Church of Saint-Materne

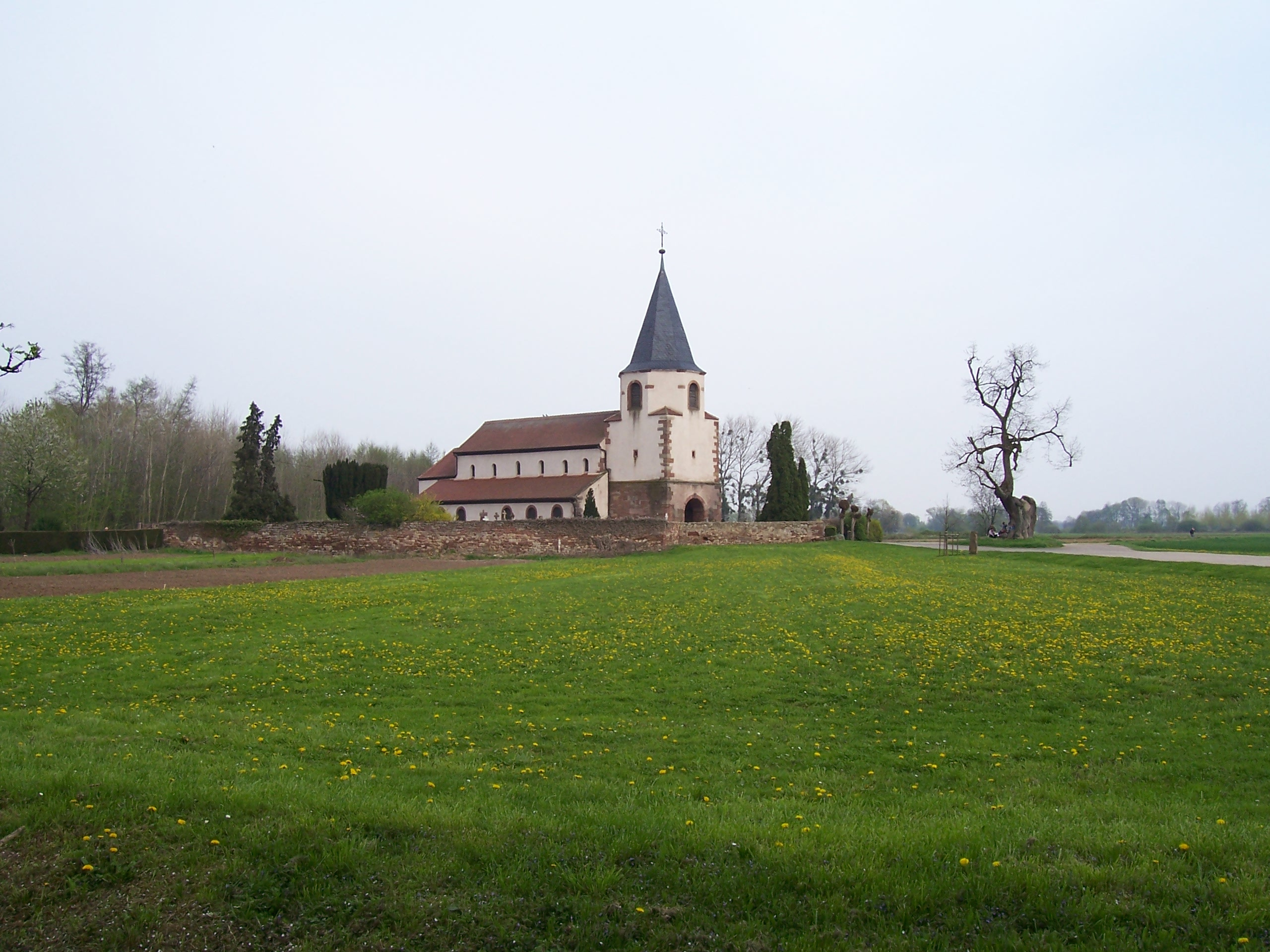
Church of Dompeter

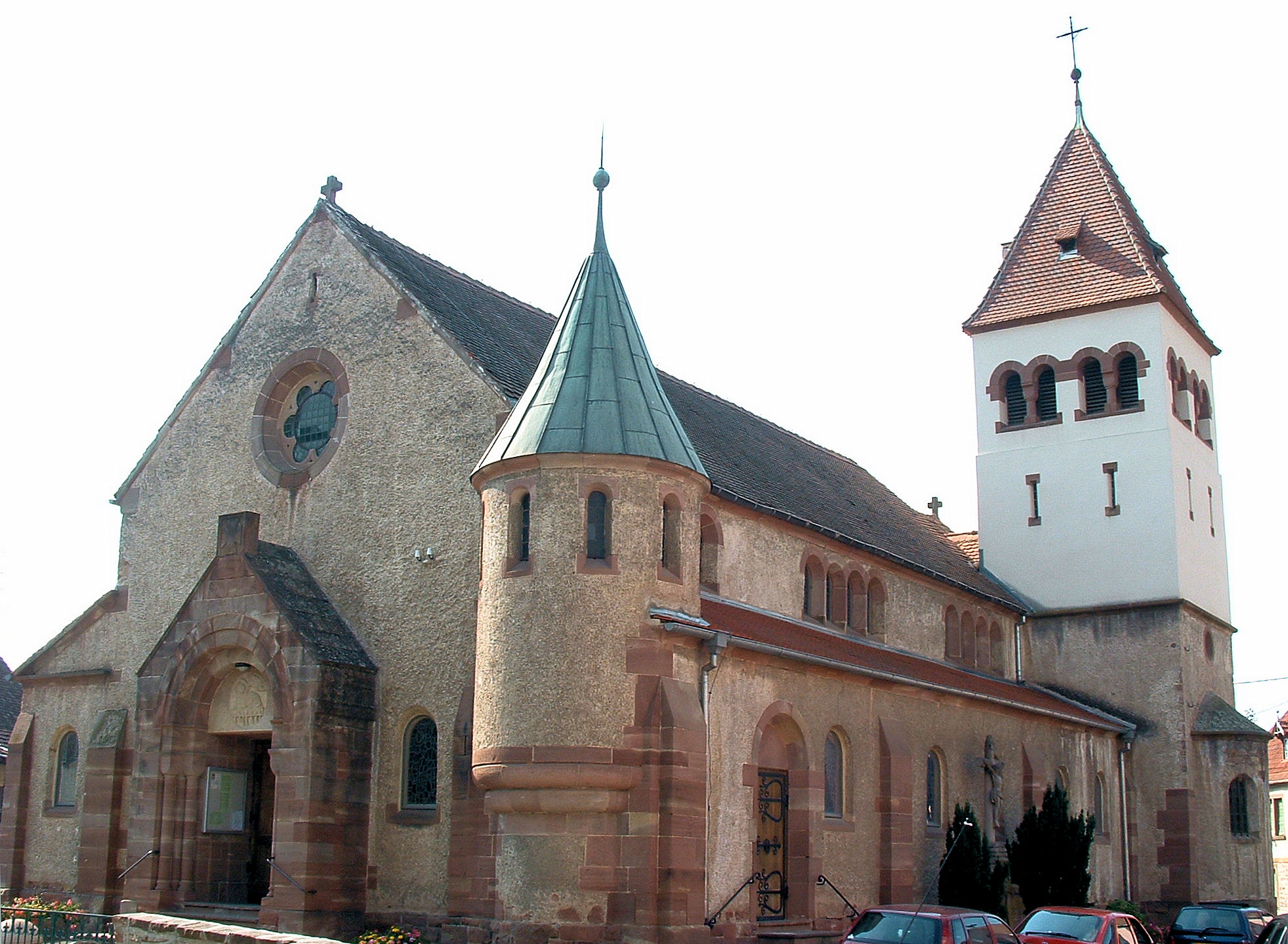
Church of Saint-Materne

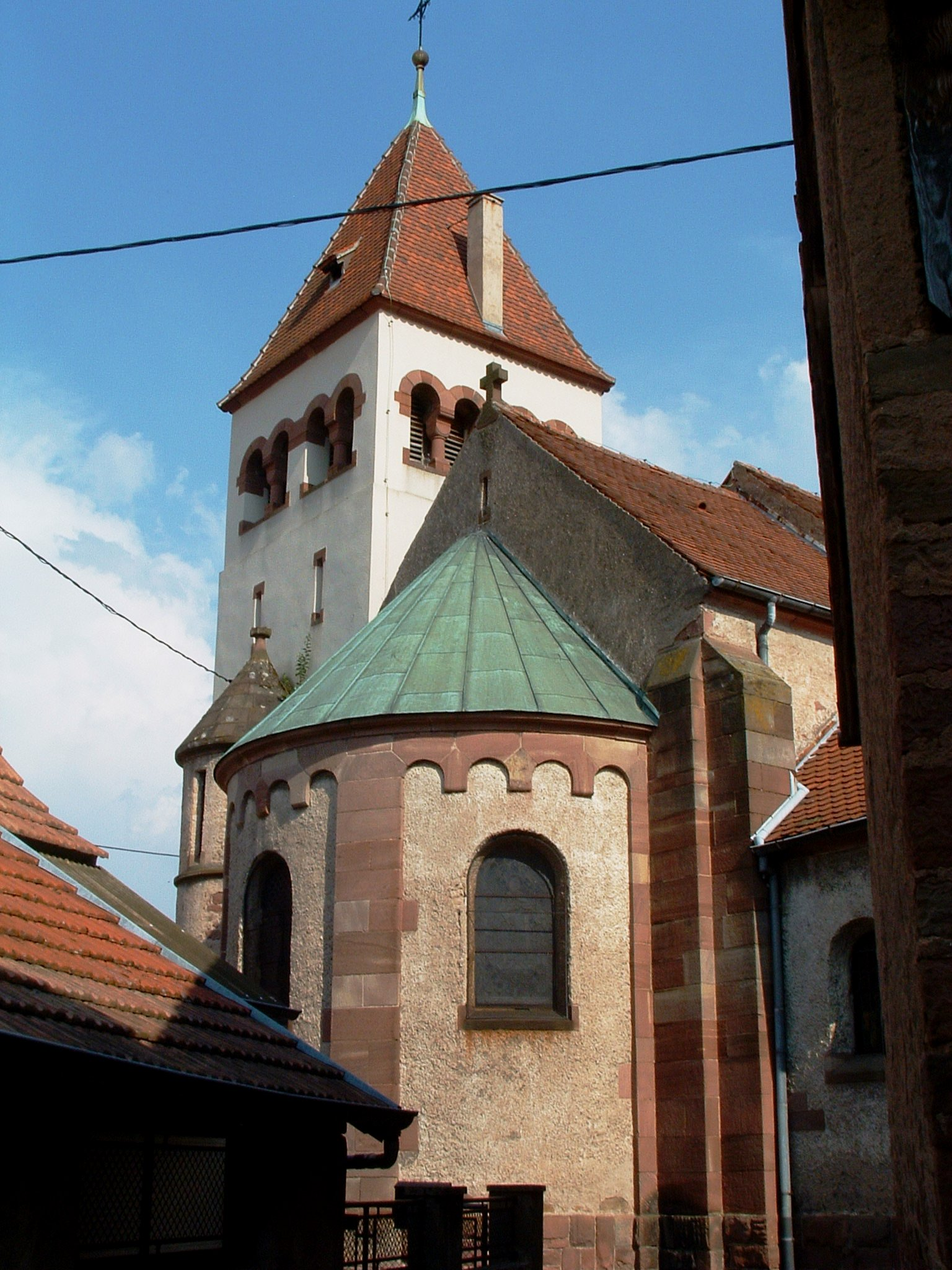
The Chevet of the Church of Saint-Materne

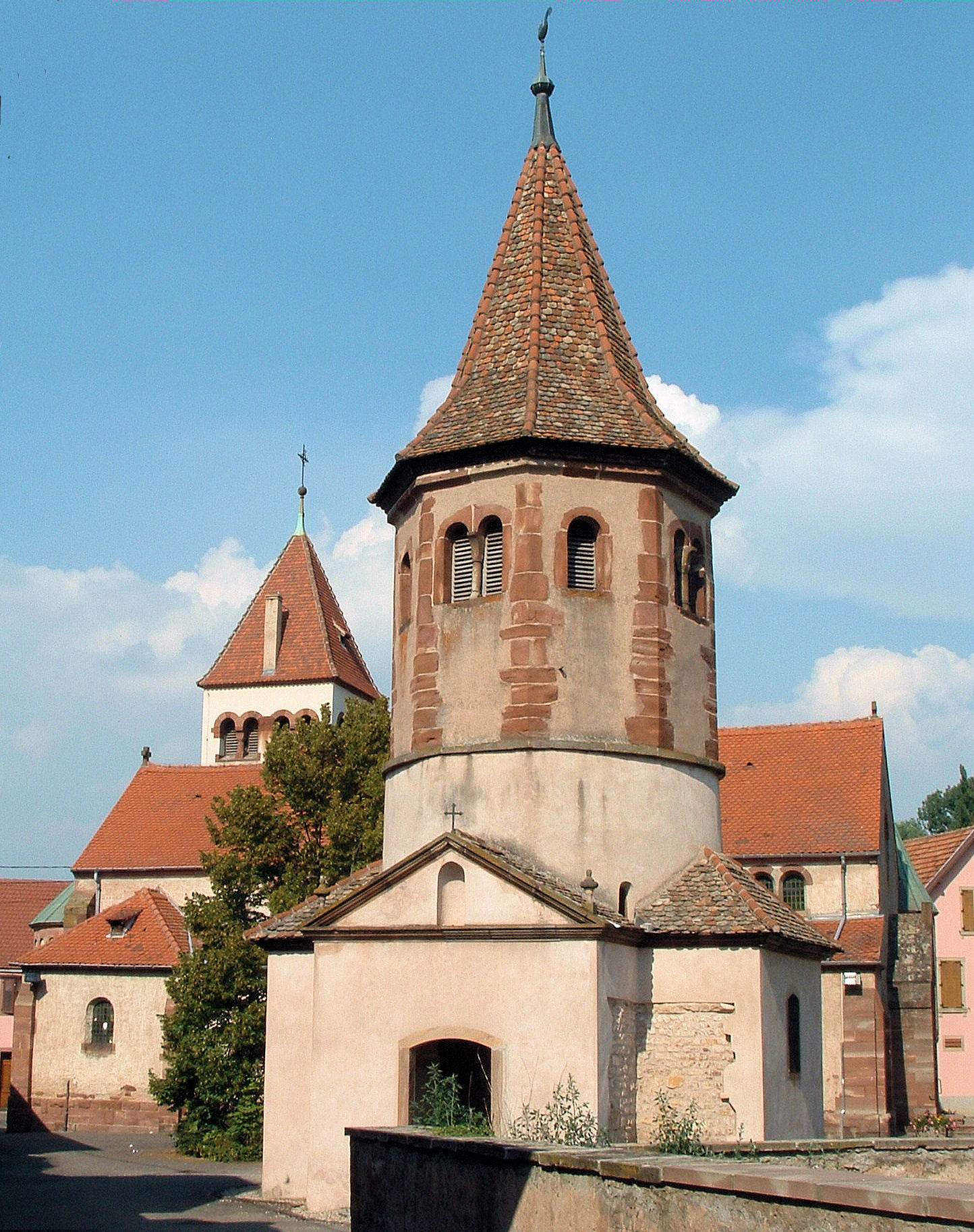
Chapel of Saint-Ulrich and église Saint-Materne

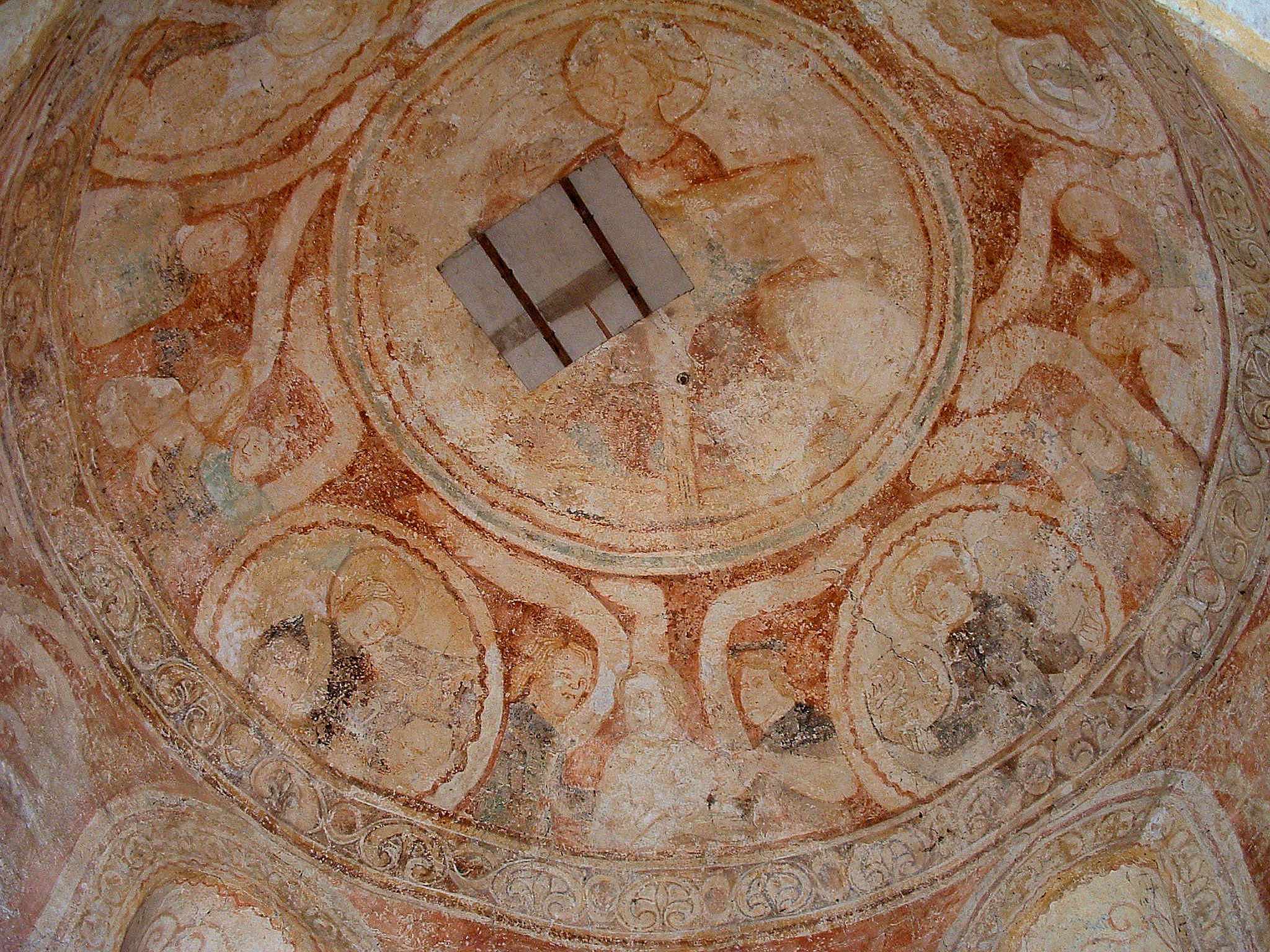
Fresco in the Chapel of Saint-Ulrich

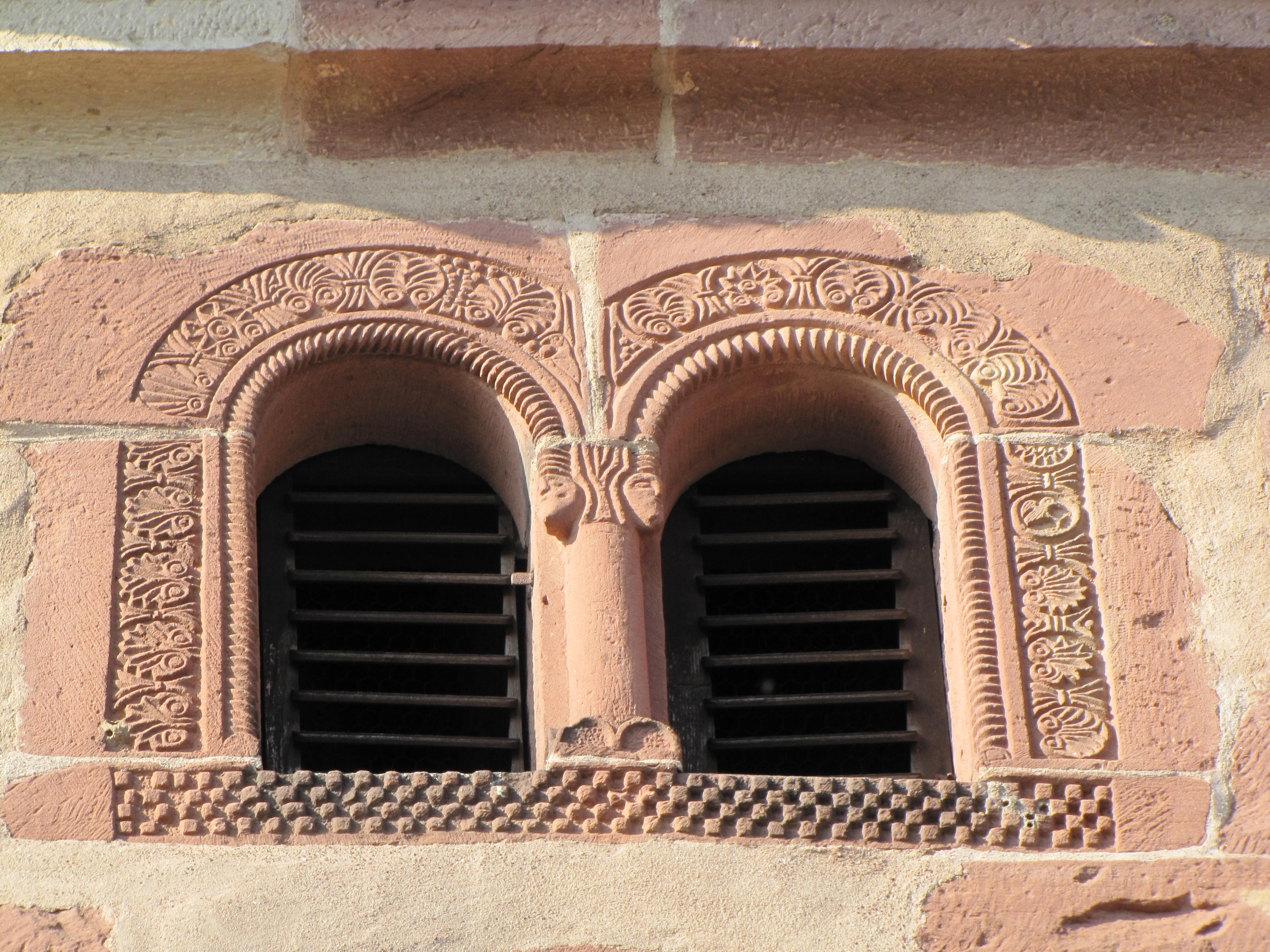
Detail on the Chapel of Saint-Ullrich

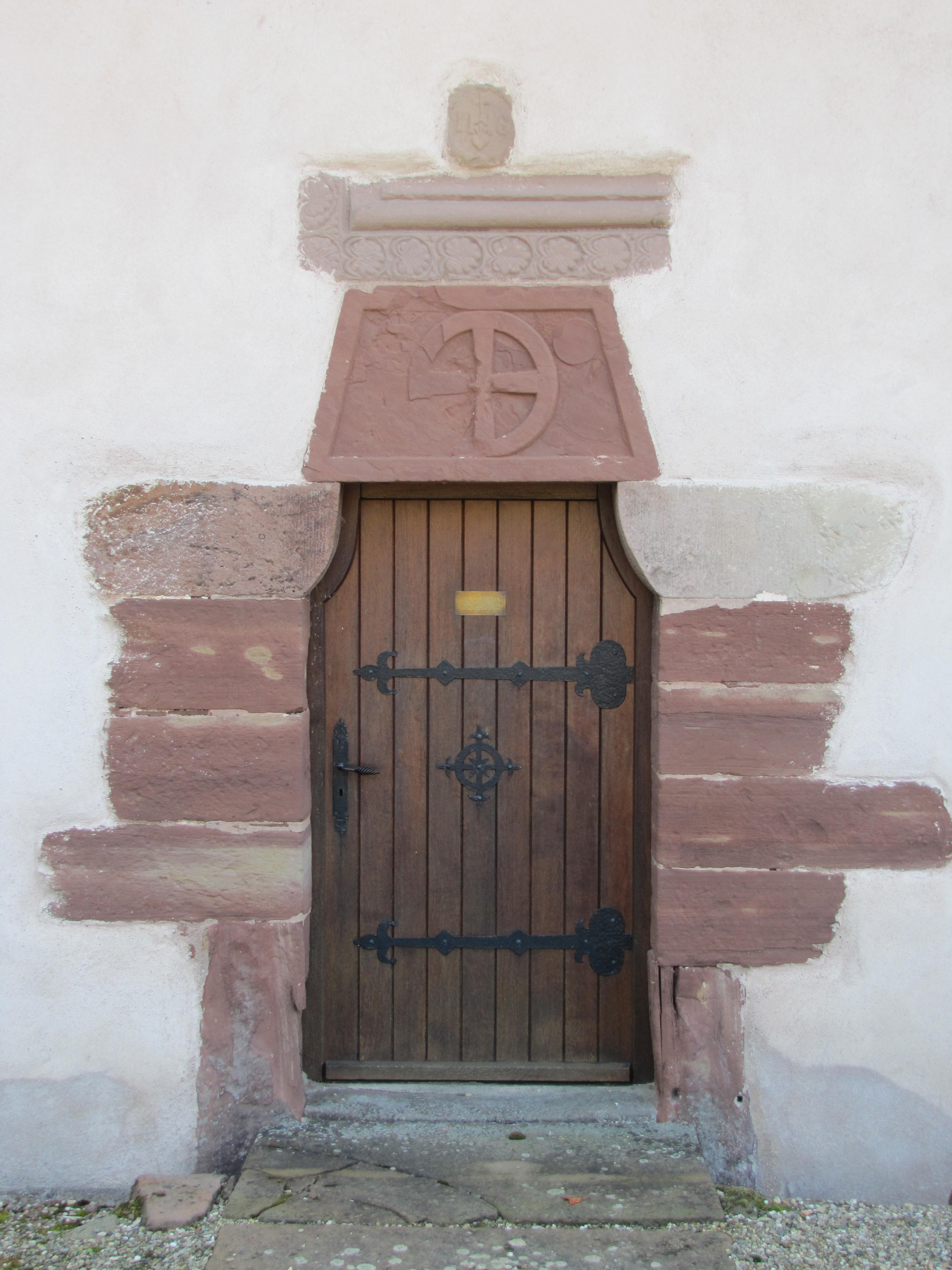
Side door at the Church of Dompeter

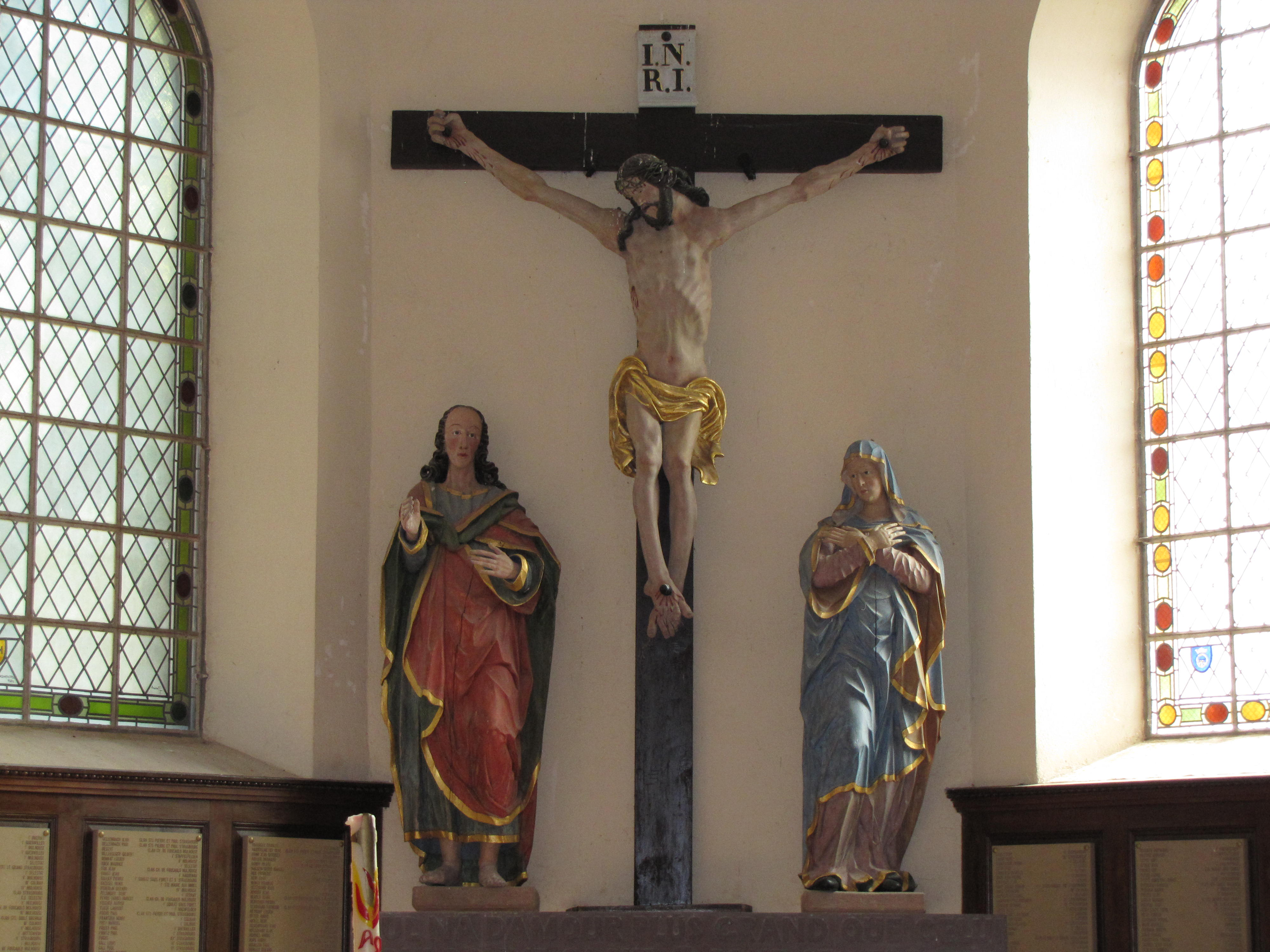
Church of Dompeter interior

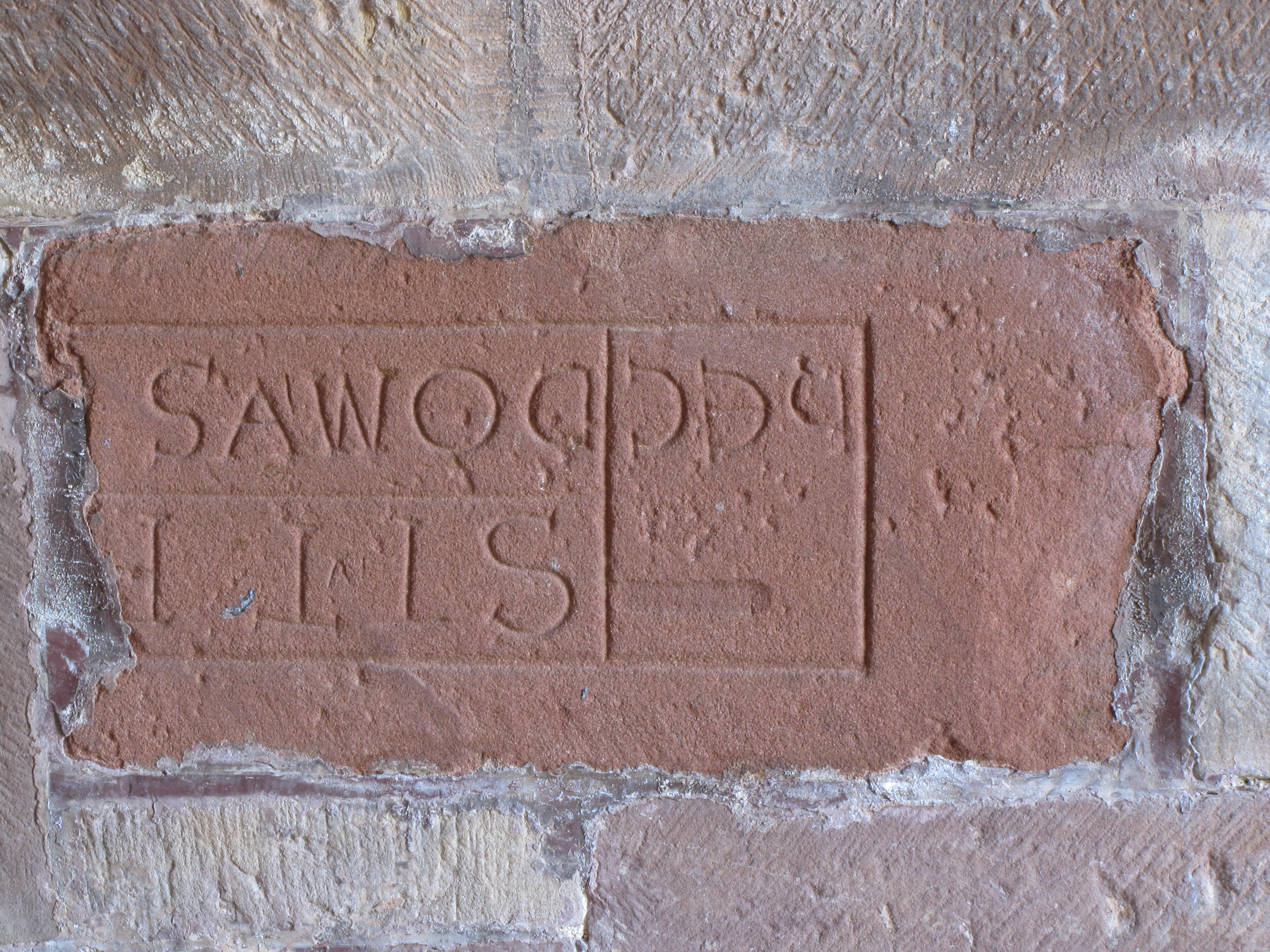
Roman inscription at the Church of Dompeter

== See also ==
- Communes of the Bas-Rhin department

== Bibliography ==
- Avolsheim over time: between Bruche and Mossig, Carré blanc, Strasbourg, 2003, 96 p. ISBN 2-84488-053-3 (in French)
- Marc Grandadam, The Romanesque buildings in Avolsheim: Church of Dompeter, Chapel of Saint Ulrich, M. Grandadam, 1989, 20 p. (in French)
- Sigrid Metken, Dompeter in Avolsheim, Schnell u. Steiner Verlag, Munich, Zurich, 1968, 23 p. (in German)
- François Reiner, Notice on the Ancient Church of Avolsheim, Levrault F. G, Strasbourg, 1827, 39 p. (in French)
- Louis Schlaefli, Avolsheim: small stories of great history, in Yearbook of the Historical and Archaeological Society of Molsheim and environs, 1996, p. 5-24 (in French)
