= Coulommiers, Seine-et-Marne =

Coulommiers
- Commune
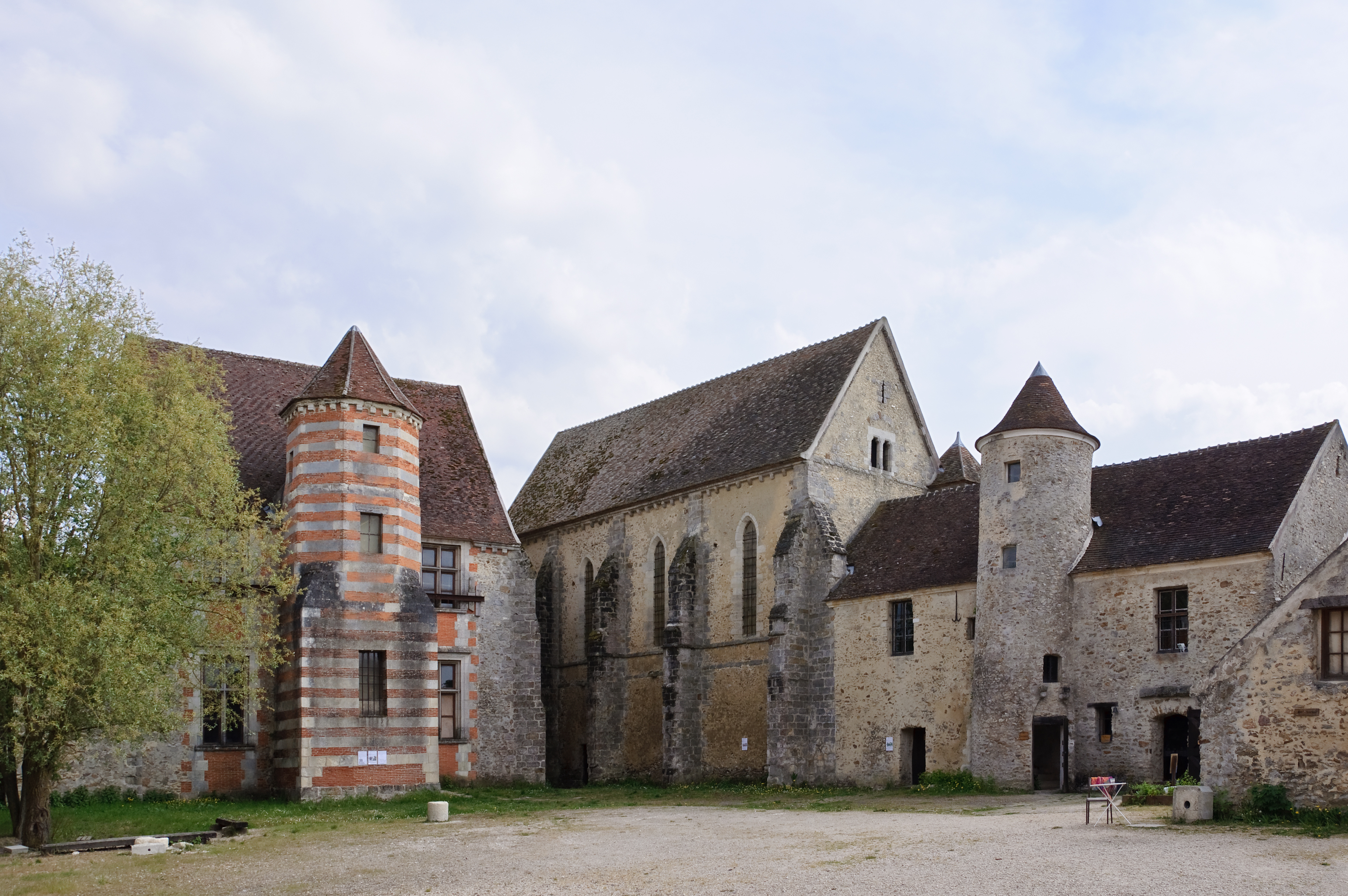
- Commanderie of the Knights Templar

- Coat of arms
- Location of Coulommiers
- Location within France Location within Île-de-France (region)
- Coordinates: 48°49′29″N 3°06′24″E
- Country: France
- Region: Île-de-France
- Department: Seine-et-Marne
- Arrondissement: Meaux
- Canton: Coulommiers
- Intercommunality: CA Coulommiers Pays de Brie

Government
  - Mayor (2020–2026): Laurence Picard
- Area^{1}: 10.93 km^{2} (4.22 sq mi)
- Highest elevation: 156 m (512 ft)
- Lowest elevation: 66 m (217 ft)
- Population (2023): 16,374
  - Density: 1,498/km^{2} (3,880/sq mi)
- Time zone: UTC+01:00 (CET)
  - Summer (DST): UTC+02:00 (CEST)
- INSEE/Postal code: 77131 /77120
- ^{1} French Land Register data, which excludes lakes, ponds, glaciers > 1 km^{2} (0.386 sq mi or 247 acres) and river estuaries.

Coulommiers (French pronunciation: [kulɔmje]) is a commune in the Seine-et-Marne department in the Île-de-France in north-central France.

It is also the name of a cheese of the Brie family produced around that city. Coulommiers station has rail connections to Tournan-en-Brie and Paris.

The town has a statue to Commandant Nicolas-Joseph Beaurepaire who, in 1792, killed himself rather than surrender Verdun to the Prussians.

== Demographics ==
Inhabitants of Coulommiers are called Columériens in French.

Historical population
Year	Pop.	±% p.a.
1968	11,263	—
1975	11,498	+0.30%
1982	11,886	+0.48%
1990	13,087	+1.21%
1999	13,852	+0.63%
2007	13,649	−0.18%
2012	14,708	+1.51%
2017	14,838	+0.18%
2023	16,374	+1.66%
Source: INSEE

== Twin towns ==
Coulommiers was twinned with Leighton Buzzard in 1958 and with Titisee-Neustadt in 1971. The twinning was renewed in 1982.

== History ==
Coulommiers was selected to be the first town in France to go fully digital for its terrestrial television, with analog switch-off in January 2009.

== Notable people ==
- André René Roussimoff (1946–1993); better known as André the Giant, professional wrestler and actor (though was billed as hailing from "Grenoble, in the French Alps")
- Nicolas-Joseph Beaurepaire, military officer

== See also ==
- Communes of the Seine-et-Marne department
