= Lac du Ballon =

Reservoir in Haut-Rhin, France

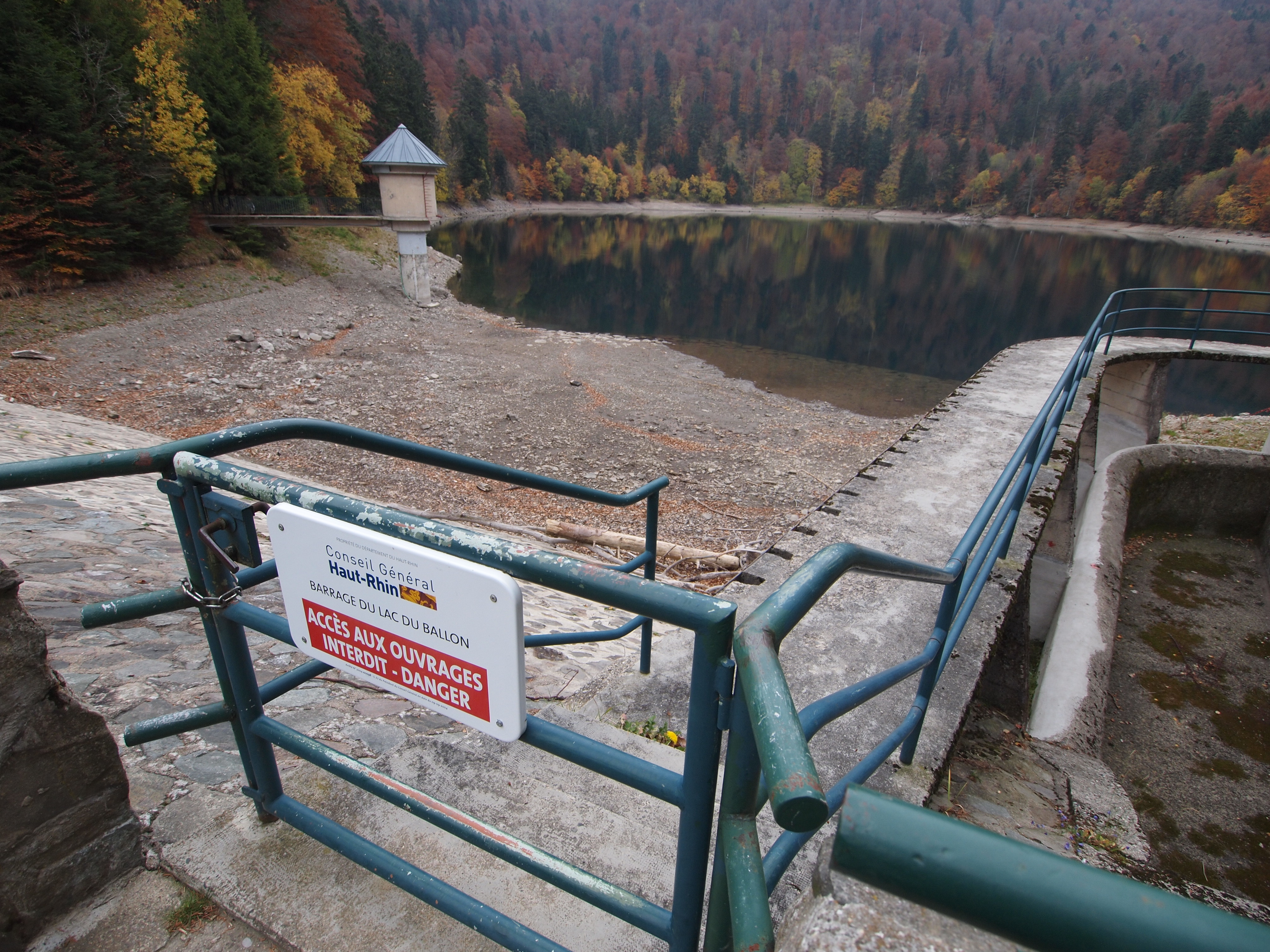
- dam, spillover and valve tower

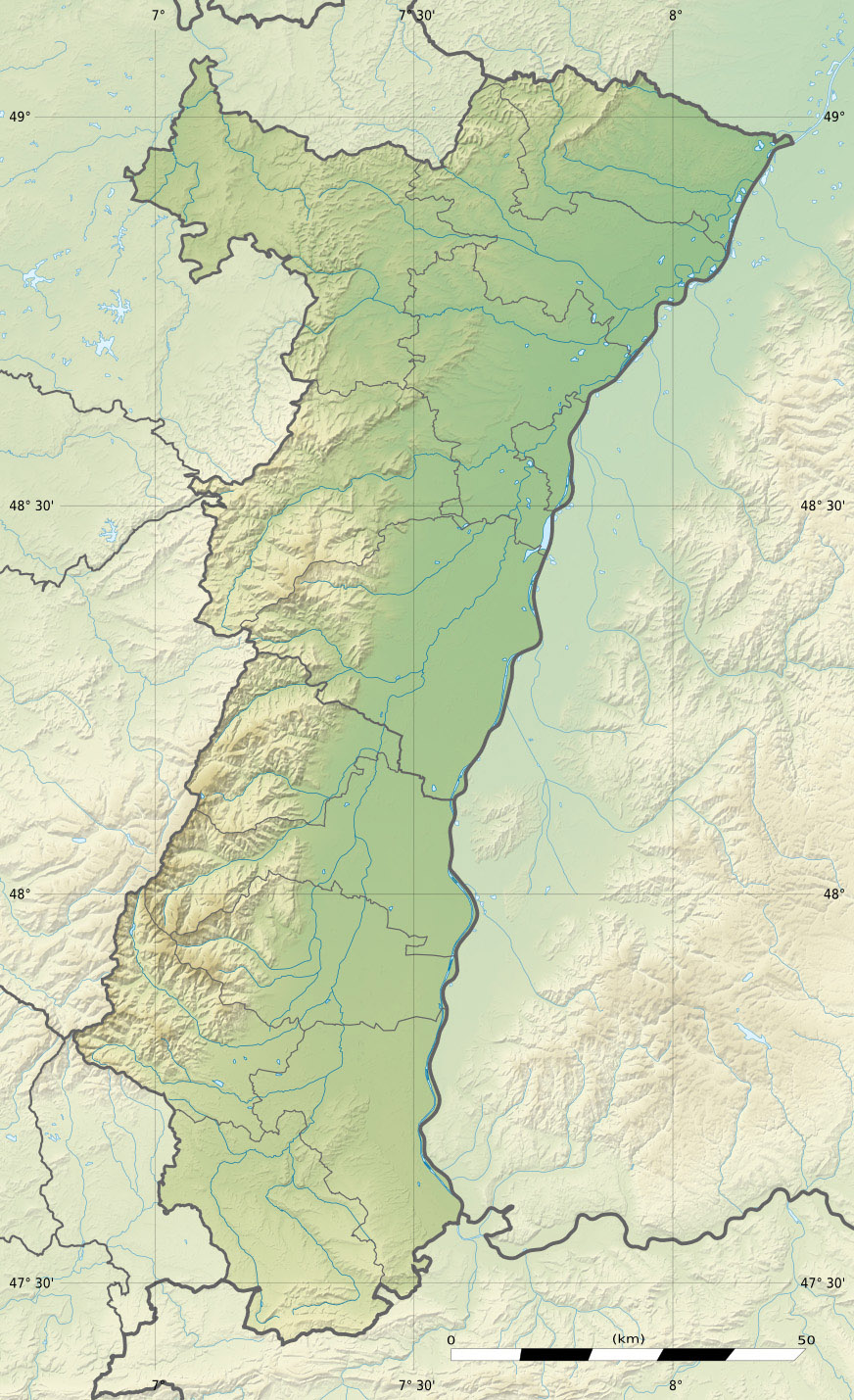
- Location within Alsace
- Location: Haut-Rhin
- Coordinates: 47.912502°N 7.095494°E
- Type: glacial
- Primary outflows: Belchenseebach → Lauch → Ill
- Catchment area: 1.5 km^{2} (0.58 sq mi)
- Basin countries: France
- Surface area: 0.08 km^{2} (0.031 sq mi)
- Max. depth: 20 m (66 ft)
- Water volume: 1,070,000 m^{3} (870 acre⋅ft)
- Surface elevation: 988 m (3,241 ft)

Lac du Ballon (French pronunciation: [lak dy balɔ̃]) is a reservoir in Haut-Rhin, France situated in a side valley of florival, on the slope of Grand Ballon mountain. At an elevation of 988 m, its surface area is 0.08 km².

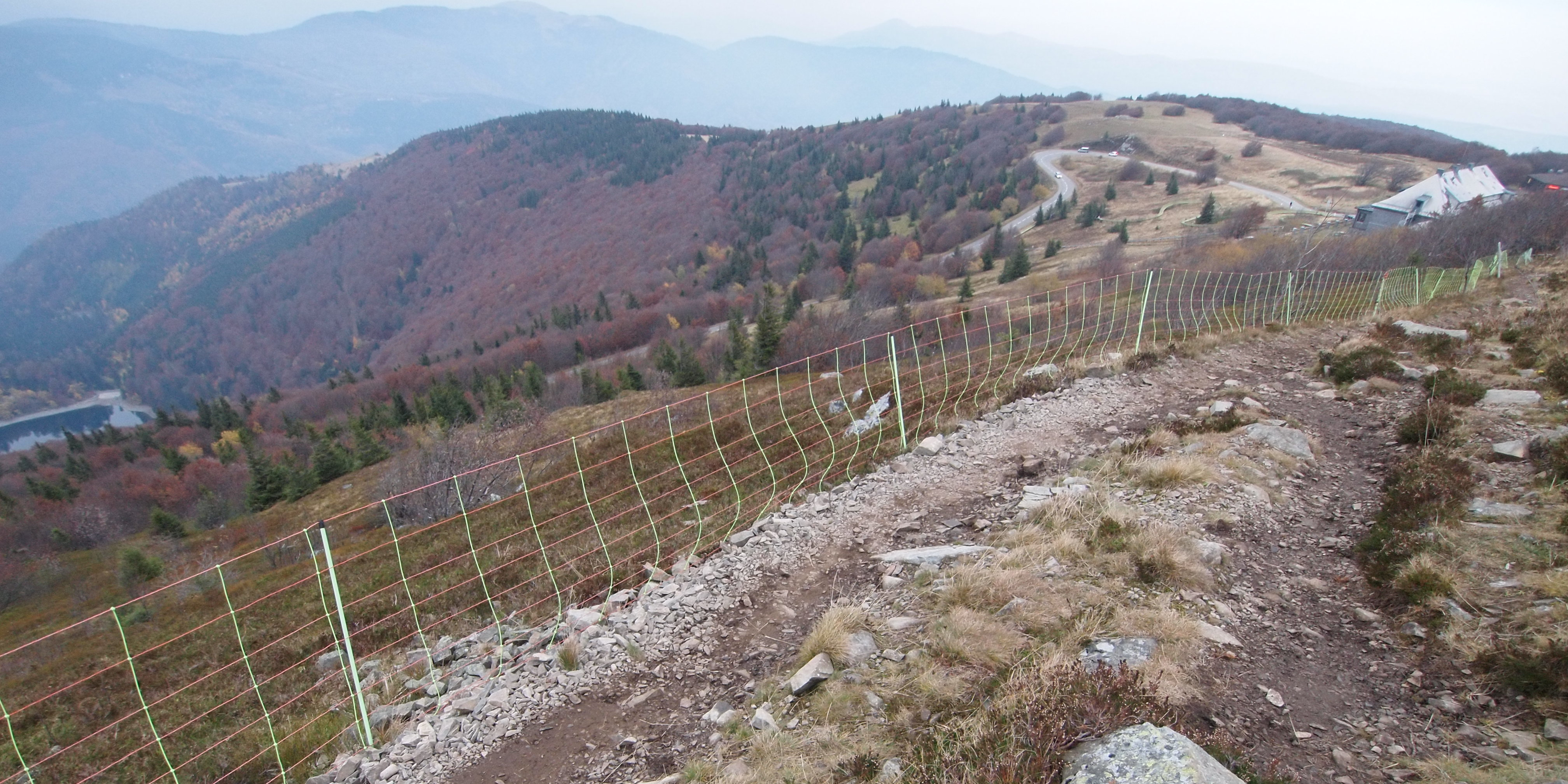
The lake, seen from the Grand Ballon, across the Ballon pass

The small glacial lake was enlarged by a dam on the moraine already in the 16th century. In 1699, Vauban had it refurbished to supply canals for the building of Neuf-Brisach. The remainders of this dam were destroyed by flooding in 1740 and 1778.

In 1869, manufacturers dug a gallery to the lake bottom to increase the usable water height. Until 1955, the rock ground became leaky.

1966–1968 the lake was tightened, the dam heightened again, with a flood spillway at the left end. The old gallery was backfilled, a new bottom outlet with a valve tower built. In 2000, the dam and the lake shore were masoned, the dam top fixed with concrete.

The lake provides fresh water supply and flood protection for the Lauch valley and the town of Guebwiller.
