= Nicolas-Joseph Beaurepaire =

French officer (1740-1792)

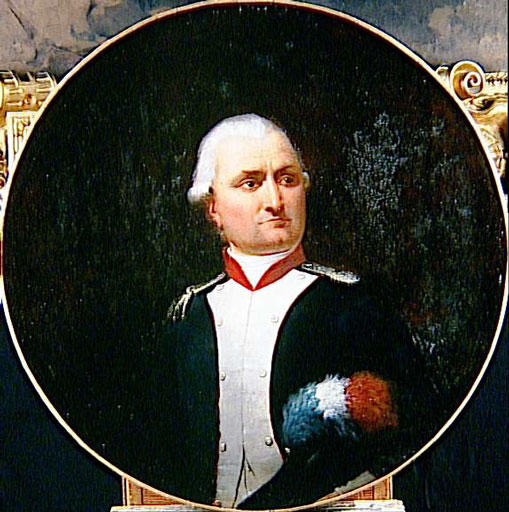
Nicolas Beaurepaire (1792)

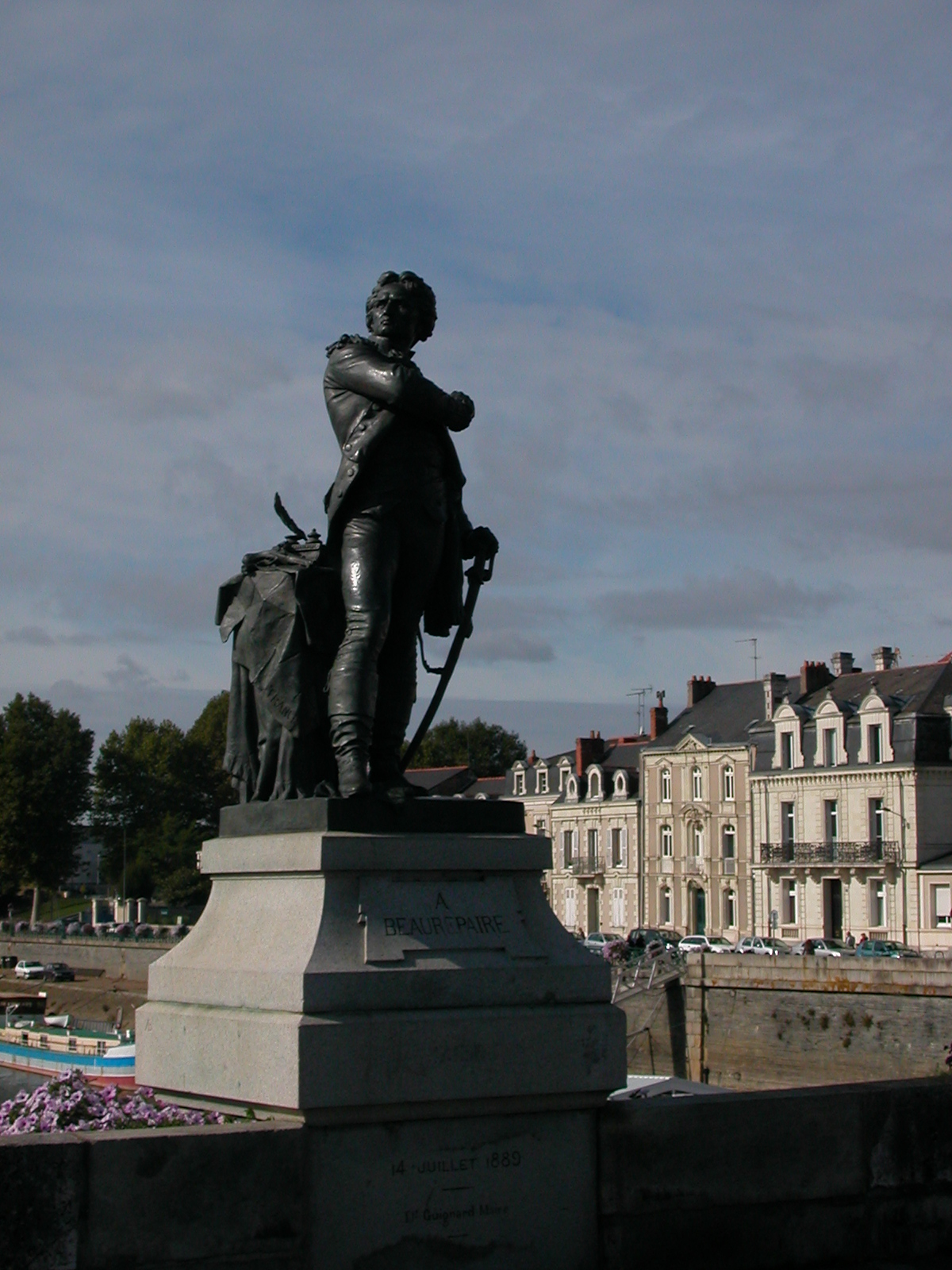
Colonel Beaurepaire

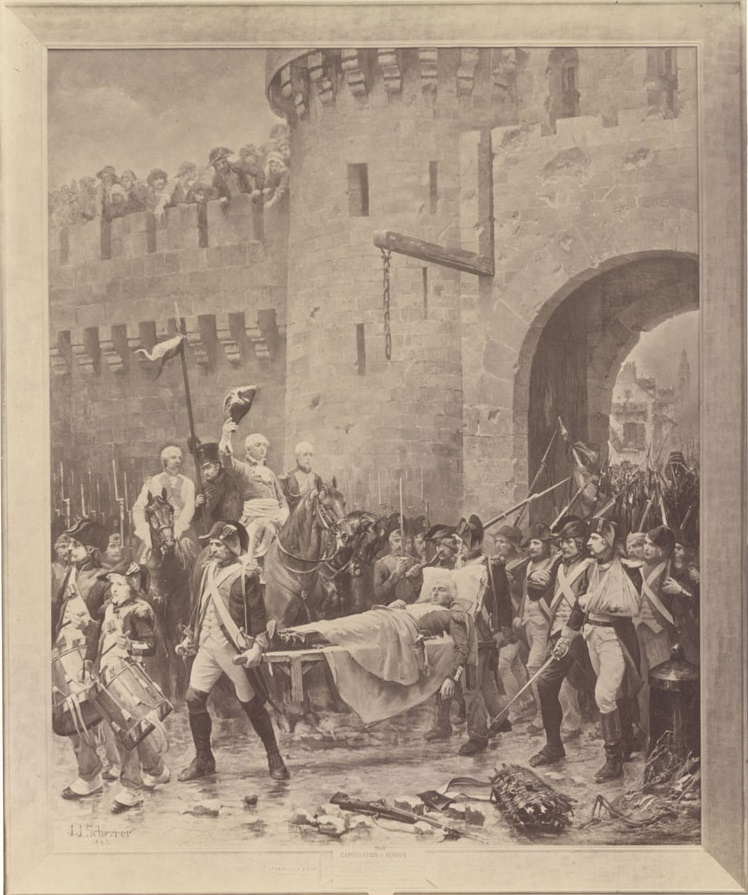
The body of Colonel Beaurepaire leaving Verdun after the battle

Nicolas-Joseph Beaurepaire (French pronunciation: [nikɔla ʒozɛf boʁpɛʁ]; 7 January 1740, in Coulommiers, Seine-et-Marne – 2 September 1792) was a French officer.

Born in Coulommiers, he commanded the defence of Verdun against the invading Allied armies of the First Coalition, shortly before they were stopped at the Battle of Valmy. He chose death by suicide to avoid the dishonour of surrendering Verdun.

He was buried in the Panthéon, though his body has since disappeared.
