= Siege of Neu-Breisach =

- Part of Franco-Prussian War
Date	13 October – 10 November 1870
Location	Neuf-Brisach, Haut-Rhin, France
Result	German Victory.

Belligerents
French Republic	North German Confederation: Prussia; Bavaria; Baden

Commanders and leaders
Lostie de Kerhor	Hermann von Schmeling

Units involved
Unknown	4th Reserve Division

Strength
More than 5,000 garrisoned	Unknown

Casualties and losses
100 officers and 5,000 soldiers were captured, 108 fire cannons, 60 horses of the cavalry, 6,000 small arms and seized stocks	70 Soldiers

The siege of Neu-Breisach was a battle of encirclement in the Franco-Prussian War, which took place from 13 October until 10 November 1870 in France. A few days after the surrender at Fort Mortier of Neu-Breisach, with a divisional reserve, German General Hermann von Schmeling forced the fortress of Neu-Breisach (which held an army garrison under the command of Shanghai Colonel Lostie de Kerhor), which surrendered, and won many spoils from the French army here. The siege demonstrated the high efficiency of the Baden batteries. With the surrender of Neu-Breisach, the Imperial German Army captured the last of the fortifications at Alsace, except for the Belfort and Bitche. After this victory, Von Schmeling moved his cannons southwest to carry out the Siege of Belfort.

The French fortress of Neu-Breisach had a garrison of 5,000 men, while Fort Mortier, located near the Rhine, was built for independent defense. In early October, detachments of the German Fourth Reserve Division, commanded by General Schmeling, were ordered beyond the Rhine from Breisgau to conduct a siege on Neu-Breisach. Near the evening of 10 May, a breakout of the French military from Neu-Breisach was attempted, only to be defeated. The same day, the German cannons caused heavy damage. However, an intense field array of German troops could not force the officer commanding Neu-Breisach to surrender, so Schmeling switched focus to the Siege of Selestat. After German artillery guns were brought in from Strasbourg, Neu-Breisach was blockaded on 9 October 1870. On 12 and 13 October, sporadic raids and engagements broke out, but to no avail. On 13 October, the encirclement was completed, when in front of Neu-Breisach were 5,000 Prussians, who formed semicircular lines of battle, with the poles lying on the banks of the Rhine. On 16 October a French siege at Neu-Breisach was broken by the Germans. Although Neu-Breisach was heavily damaged by German artillery during the siege, the Germans remained unable to defeat Neu-Breisach quickly.

On 26 October 1870, after defeating Sélestat, Major General von Schmeling - as commander of the Neu-Breisach siege and blockade corps consisting of Prussian, Bavarian and Baden units - sited the bulk of his division and the artillery battery placed in front of Sélestat south along the Rhine to carry out the siege of Neu-Breisach. He undertook the siege of Neu-Breisach forcefully, and during this period, German infantry forces approached Neu-Breisach. On 2 November, from several locations such as Alt-Breisach, German cannons commenced fire. In the face of aggressive German artillery fire, the French garrison put up a fierce resistance, although on 3 November, the Mortier fortress and its structures were destroyed along with a few artillery pieces. France here was damaged. Finally, on 7 November, the attack took effect: French Captain Castelli surrendered at Fort Mortier beneath the rubble. The German army took prisoners and cannons from the French. The French defending at Neu-Breisach were in a difficult position. Three days after the fall of Mortier, Neu-Breisach surrendered on the same terms as those at Sélestat. On 11 November, the Prussian army occupied the city walls; an hour later, their prisoners left their posts.
