= Siege of Verdun (1870) =

1870 in France during the Franco-Prussian War

- Part of Franco-Prussian War
Date	13 October – 8 November 1870
Location	Verdun, Meuse, France
Result	German victory

Belligerents
French Republic	North German Confederation: Prussia; Saxony

Commanders and leaders
Guérin de Waldersbach; General Marnier	Unknown

Strength
1,500 regulars (including 50 artillerymen), 2,000 Infantry part of the Garde Mobile and 1,400 National Guardsmen, 20 mortars, 2 mortars and 90 cannons	15,000 Infantry and 140 artillery pieces

Casualties and losses
French garrison (except national guard), captured	Unknown

The Siege of Verdun was a battle fought in France during the Franco-Prussian War from 13 October until 8 November 1870.

The siege was launched by the Legion of Saxony. After fierce resistance by the French army at the fortress of Verdun (longer resistance than any other French fortress), the siege ended with Verdun taking the lead with German Army goods. Verdun then became a fortress on the Franco-German border but surrendered to the German army in the Franco-Prussian War. The French artillery was noted to be effective during the siege.

== Background ==
During the War of the First Coalition, Verdun was invaded by the Prussian Army in 1792 leading to the original Siege of Verdun, before the French victory in the Battle of Valmy forced the Prussians to retreat. In 1870, Verdun offered fiercer resistance, but when the Saxon forces emerged from the east, Verdun had only a small garrison. For a time, the Germans just kept Verdun under surveillance, but on August 24, a German offensive was directed. The French conducted several breakouts after the prisoners escaped after the Battle of Sedan reinforcements.

== Siege ==
In late September, German forces (including the Landwehr militia ) assembled under the command of General Von Gayl on the eastern front. Although the blockade of Verdun began on 25 October, on 7 October, two German Artillery crews were made to create conditions for the infantry and advanced a few hundred steps and established its positions The Germans then cleared all obstacles. On 13 October Verdun was officially locked down. The German artillery attacks failed, although the citadel of Verdun was severely damaged. General Marnier, commanding the French garrison, launched strong raids that were initially victorious. Meanwhile, the German generals were preoccupied with the Siege of Metz, so they lacked enough forces to also besiege Verdun.

After the fall of Metz, the German First Army reinforced the army besieging Verdun. The French army at Verdun was at a disadvantage. Faced with that situation, after a truce, Verdun surrendered under rare favorable conditions. The French garrison was taken prisoner, with the exception of the French National Guard. The French officers were paroled, and materials, weapons, cannons, etc. of the city of Verdun were agreed to be restored once peace was restored. Not long after Verdun surrendered, the German army occupied the French fortress of Neuf-Brisach.
