= Battle of Verdun (1792) =

1792 Battle during the War of the First Coalition

- Part of the War of the First Coalition
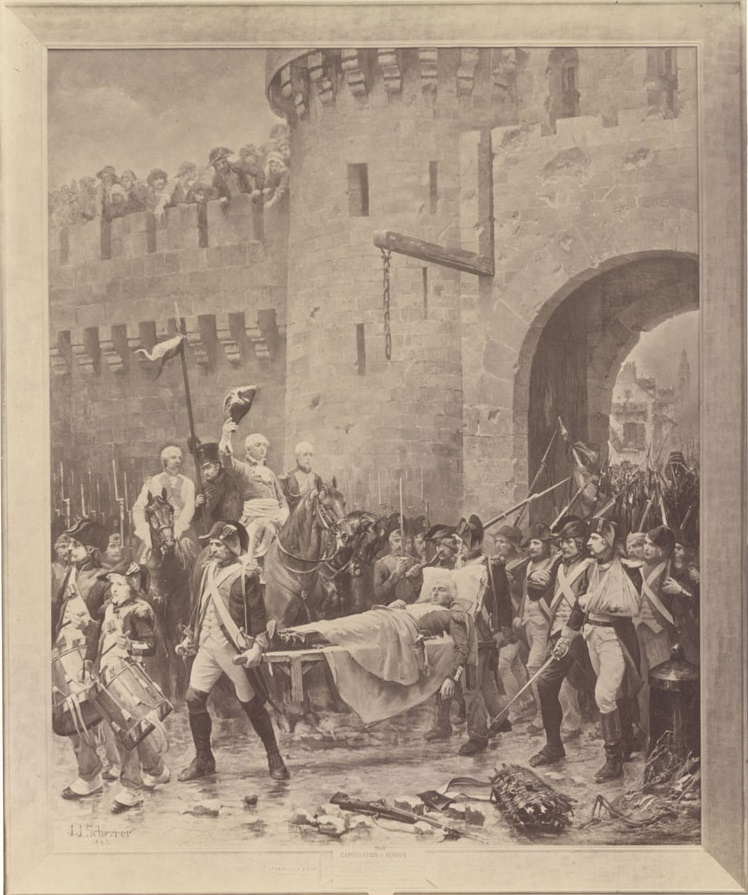
- The body of Colonel Beaurepaire leaving Verdun after the battle.
Date	29 August – 2 September 1792
Location	Verdun, France 49.1608°N 5.3884°E
Result	Prussian victory

Belligerents
(Constitutional Cabinet of Louis XVI) Kingdom of France	Kingdom of Prussia

Commanders and leaders
(Constitutional Cabinet of Louis XVI) Colonel Beaurepaire †	(Kingdom of Prussia) Charles II, Duke of Brunswick-Wolfenbüttel

Strength
4,000	40,000
- Location within Europe

The Battle of Verdun was fought between 29 August and 2 September 1792 between French Revolutionary forces and a Prussian army during the opening months of the War of the First Coalition. The Prussians were victorious, gaining a clear westward path to Paris.

== Battle ==
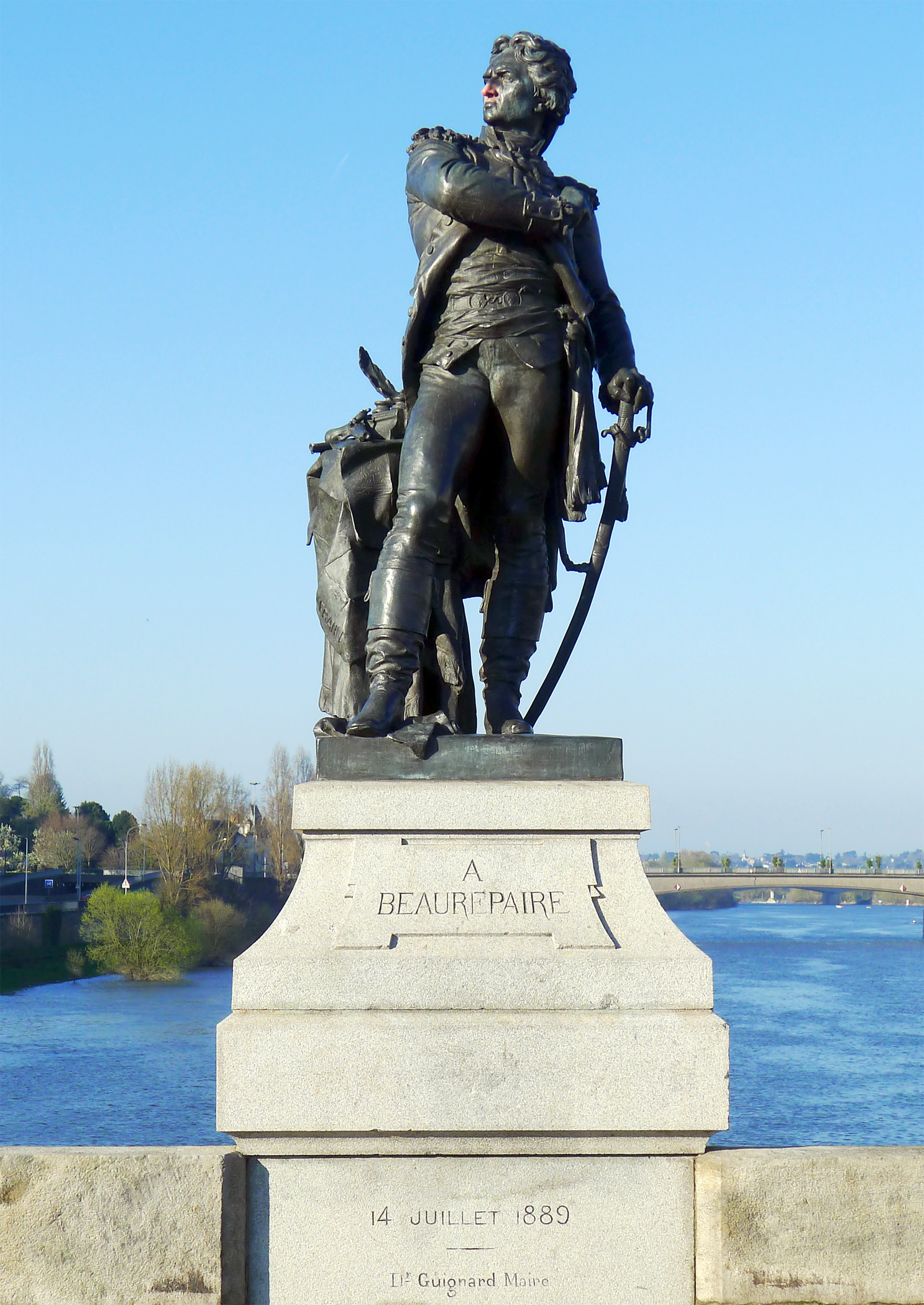
Nicolas-Joseph Beaurepaire's statue, on the pont de Verdun in Angers.

The city of Verdun, located in a bend in the Meuse River, is a strategic fortress built by Vauban during the reign of Louis XIV to protect the borders of the Kingdom of France.

Following France's declaration of war on Austria on 20 April 1792, French troops entered the Austrian Netherlands to aid the Brabant Revolution. On 28 April 1792, General Rochambeau's Army of the North, divided into 3 columns, marched on Mons, Tournai and Veurne.

On 29 April, General Biron's column approaching Mons fled after 2 regiments of dragoons had disbanded in full view of the enemy with cries of "Treason! Save who can!".

At the same time, General Théobald Dillon's column fled in the same way near Tournai.

The third column, without support, was forced to retreat without having spotted the enemy.

The offensive of General Marqis de Lafayette's Army of the Centre, which was to take Namur and then Liège up the Meuse valley, was immediately stopped at Givet.

The various events in Poland did not allow the Austrians to take advantage of their advantages and to penetrate, alone, into French Flanders, saving, in all likelihood, the French armies from a total rout.

After the Brunswick Manifesto on 25 July, to which the people of Paris responded by storming the Tuileries, the Generalfeldmarschall, Duke of Brunswick, decided to invade France at the head of Austrian and Prussian troops.

On 19 August 1792, Prussian, Austrian and Hessian troops of 150,000 men, accompanied by 20,000 émigrés, crossed the border.

On 19 August, a first engagement took place at Fontoy between Hohenlohe's 22,000 troops and those of French Marshal Nicolas Luckner, who resisted bravely, but were routed by superior numbers.

But the difficulties begin; the Allied armies met with a hostile reception from the French population, contrary to the claims of the Émigrés. On the other hand, the fatigue of the coalition soldiers was accentuated by incessant rain and dysentery that decimated the Prussian ranks.

On 20 August, the coalition advanced and laid siege to Longwy, which after being bombarded, capitulated on 23 August 1792. On the same 20 August, a Prussian column arrived in sight of Verdun. A clash between Prussian troops and weak French troops took place in the vicinity of the city. The victorious Prussians remained off the mighty fortress until 29 August when, reinforced by the bulk of their troops, they invested the city.

Under the orders of Colonel Nicolas-Joseph Beaurepaire, the fortress, which was not ready to be sieged, organized itself to resist as long as possible the 60,000 men and 40 cannons who besieged it and bombarded the city from August 31 from 11 p.m. until 8 a.m. the next day. Beaurepaire had only the ^{92nd} Line Regiment and six battalions of National Guards, i.e. about 3,000 men, as a garrison. The artillery of the square had only 40 cannons available out of the 150 planned. The fortifications themselves, abandoned since Louis XV, had serious weaknesses: lack of parapets on the ramparts; absence of masonry on 600 metres of the perimeter wall. On September 2, the City Council voted to surrender. Colonel Beaurepaire was found dead from a bullet in the head, an enemy shot or suicide.

On the same day, the Prussians entered the city to the acclamations of the royalists orchestrated by the Émigrés. The wives and daughters of notables who offered sugared almonds to the King of Prussia were guillotined when the city was retaken by the revolutionary forces of the National Convention.

== See also ==
- Battle of Valmy on 20 September 1792, a following battle during the War of the First Coalition
- Unrelated battles, but also at Verdun:
  - Siege of Verdun (1870) in the Franco-Prussian War
  - Battle of Verdun (1916) in World War I

== Notes ==
Preceded by French Revolution	French Revolution: Revolutionary campaigns Battle of Verdun (1792)	Succeeded by Siege of Thionville (1792)
