= Louis Schlaefli =

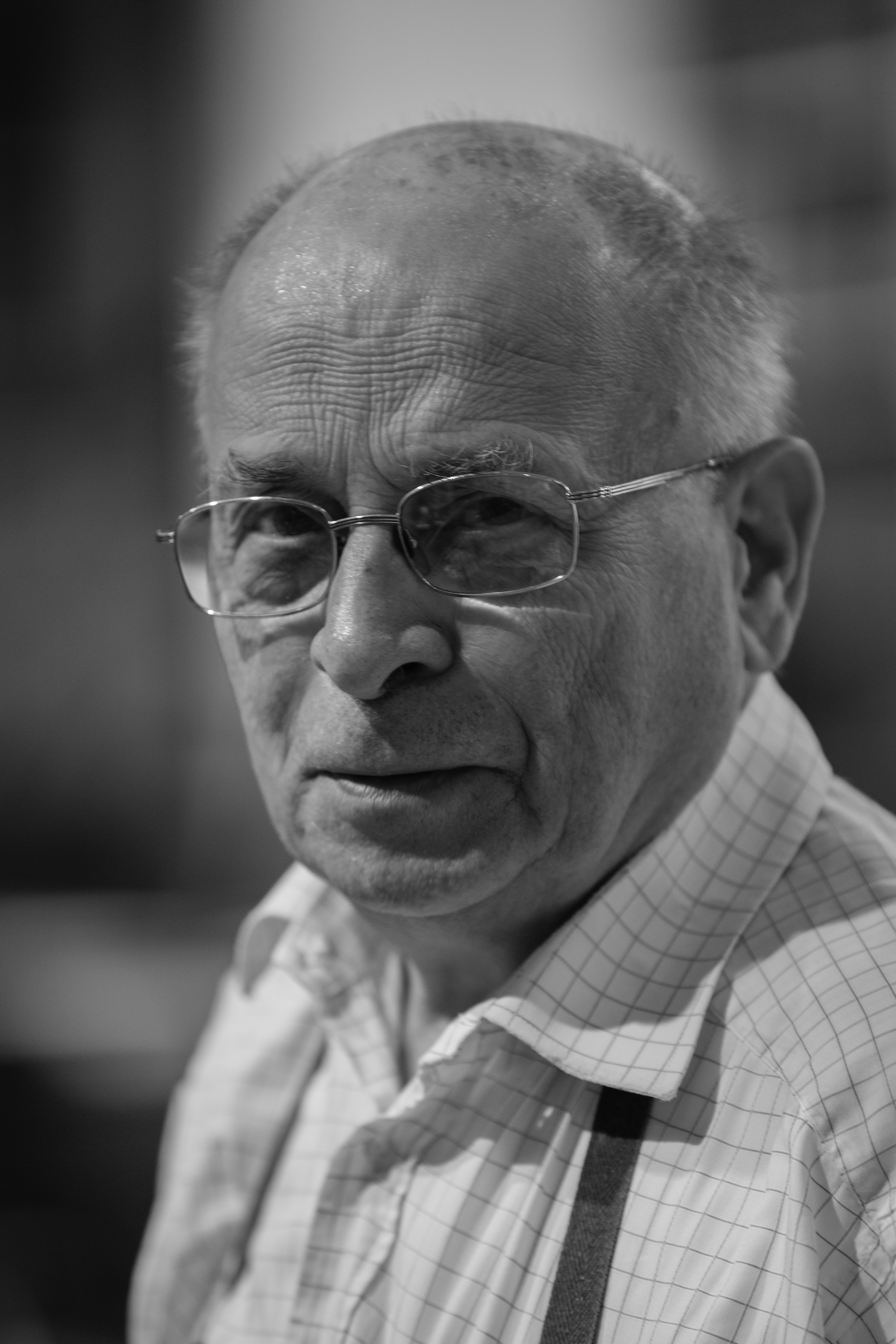
Louis Schlaefli in June 2013

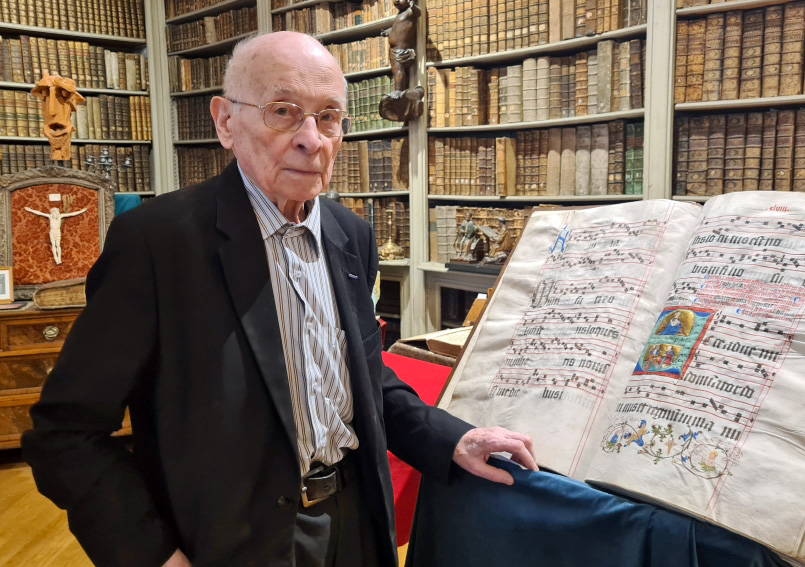
Louis Schlaefli in June 2026

Louis Schlaefli (4 December 1938, Neuf-Brisach) is a Franco-Swiss scholar, collector, and librarian. Since 1964 he has been the librarian of the Sainte-Marie-Majeure Seminary in Strasbourg, for which he composed several major catalogs. He is also the author of more than five hundred articles and contributions related to the heritage and history of Alsace, mostly religious ones.

== Selected publications ==
Detailed references of about 300 of these 500 publications by Louis Schlaefli are included in the online catalog of the National and University Library in Strasbourg.

- Les Publications de la Grande congrégation académique de Molsheim, in Marian Library Studies, 1975, vol. 7, p. 303-324
- La plus ancienne image pieuse du Schauenberg, in Marian Library Studies (University of Dayton), 1977, vol. 9, p. 273-279, 5 pl.
- L'Alsace et les Chartreux, 1988, p. 44-50
- Les bouteilles de la Passion, in Almanach Sainte-Odile, 1988, p. 115-119
- Petites images de piété alsaciennes, Musée de l'image populaire de Pfaffenhoffen, 1989, 107 p. (in collaboration with François Lotz)
- Procès de sorcellerie à Molsheim, 1589-1697, Huber, 1993, 160 p.
- (in German) Katalog der Bücher aus der ehemalingen Bibliothek des Johannes Pistorius Niddanus d.J. (1546-1608) : die im Grand Séminaire zu Strasbourg zu finden sind : Bestand : 150 Titel zwischen 1490-1600 ediert, Emmendingen, 1994 (in collaboration with Hans-Juergen Guenther)
- (in German) Katalog der Bücher aus der ehemaligen Bibliothek der Pfarrherren Martin+Hieremias+Lazarus Rapp aus Offenburg die im Grand Séminaire zu Strasbourg zu finden sind : Bestand : 462 Titel zwischen 1481 und 1609 ediert, Emmendingen, 1995 (in collaboration with Hans-Juergen Guenther)
- Chartreux de Molsheim et chartreux alsaciens (XVIIIe-XXe), in Annuaire de la société d'histoire et d'archéologie de Molsheim et environs, 1995, p. 101-113
- Catalogue des livres du seizième siècle (1531-1599) de la bibliothèque du Grand séminaire de Strasbourg, Valentin Koerner, Baden-Baden, 1995, 676 p.
- Supplément au catalogue des incunables et livres du XVIe (jusqu'en 1530) de la Bibliothèque du Grand Séminaire de Strasbourg, 1995, tiré à part des Archives de l'Église d'Alsace, 51, 1993–1994, p. 10-68
- À propos des mouches espagnoles ou une affaire de sorcellerie à la Wantzenau au XVIIe siècle, in Annuaire de la Société des Amis du Vieux Strasbourg, n° 25, 1996-1997
- Molsheim, Alsace-France, Edira, 1996, 48 p. (in collaboration with Paul Kestler and Grégory Oswald)
- Un cas de sorcellerie de Niederentzen (1618), in Annuaire de la société d'histoire de la Hardt et du Ried, 1996, n° 9, p. 53-54
- Meuniers et moulins de Dinsheim sous l'Ancien Régime, in Annuaire de la société d'histoire et d'archéologie de Molsheim et environs, 1996, p. 29-52
- Kanonikus Alexandre Straub auf Studienreise in Baden, in Die Ortenau, n° 77, 1997, p. 459-484
- Les aveux d'un sorcier de neuf ans originaire de Saverne, in Pays d'Alsace. Cahier de la Société d'histoire et d'archéologie de Saverne et environs, n° 182, 1998, p. 1–26
- Inventaires de bibliothèques de curés d'Obernai et des environs (1579-1689), in Annuaire de la Société d'histoire et d'archéologie de Dambach-la-ville/Barr/Obernai, 32, 1998, p. 131-146
- Le couvent des Pénitentes de Sainte-Madeleine à Strasbourg. Notes historiques et artistiques, leçons d'un obituaire, in Annuaire de la Société des Amis du Vieux Strasbourg, n° 26, 1998–1999, p. 57–67
- (in German) Vier Pfarrbibliotheken des 16. Jahrhunderts aus Offenburg und der Ortenau, in Die Ortenau, n° 80, 2000, p. 171-176
- Un document d'art populaire religieux : un manuscrit illustre de Bollwiller (1769-1770), in Cahiers alsaciens d'archéologie d'art et d'histoire, XLIII, 2000, p. 149-164
- (in German) Der Pfarrklerus der Ortenau. Die drei rechtsrheinischen Ruralkapitel des ehemaligen Bistums Strassburg (14. bis 17. Jahrhundert). Eine Dokumentation, in Simpliciana XXV (2003), p. 277-378 and XXVII (2005), p. 213-308
- Catalogue de la bibliothèque du couvent de la Divine Providence à Ribeauvillé : fonds anciens (XVe - XVIIe siècles), Valentin Koerner, Baden-Baden, 2002, 237 p.
- Guerres mondiales et images pieuses, in Cahiers Alsaciens d'archéologie, d'art et d'histoire, 50, 2007
- Particularités relatives aux procès de sorcellerie intentés aux enfants à Molsheim au XVIIe siècle, in Revue d’Alsace, n° 134, 2008, p. 213-227
- Le collège épiscopal Saint-Étienne, Éd. du Signe, 2011, 347 p.
- 150 images de Saint-Étienne, Strasbourg, 2011, 64 p.

== Bibliography ==
- Jean-Marie Le Minor, « Louis Schlaefli », in Nouveau dictionnaire de biographie alsacienne, Fédération des sociétés d'histoire et d'archéologie d'Alsace, 2006, vol. 47, p. 4923-4924
- Christine Muller, « Louis Schlaefli, le conservateur des merveilles », in Les Saisons d'Alsace, n°29, 2005, p. 112
- Mélanges offerts à Louis Schlaefli, Société d'histoire et d'archéologie de Molsheim et environs, 2008, 160 p.
