= Neuf-Brisach =

Commune in Grand Est, France

- Commune
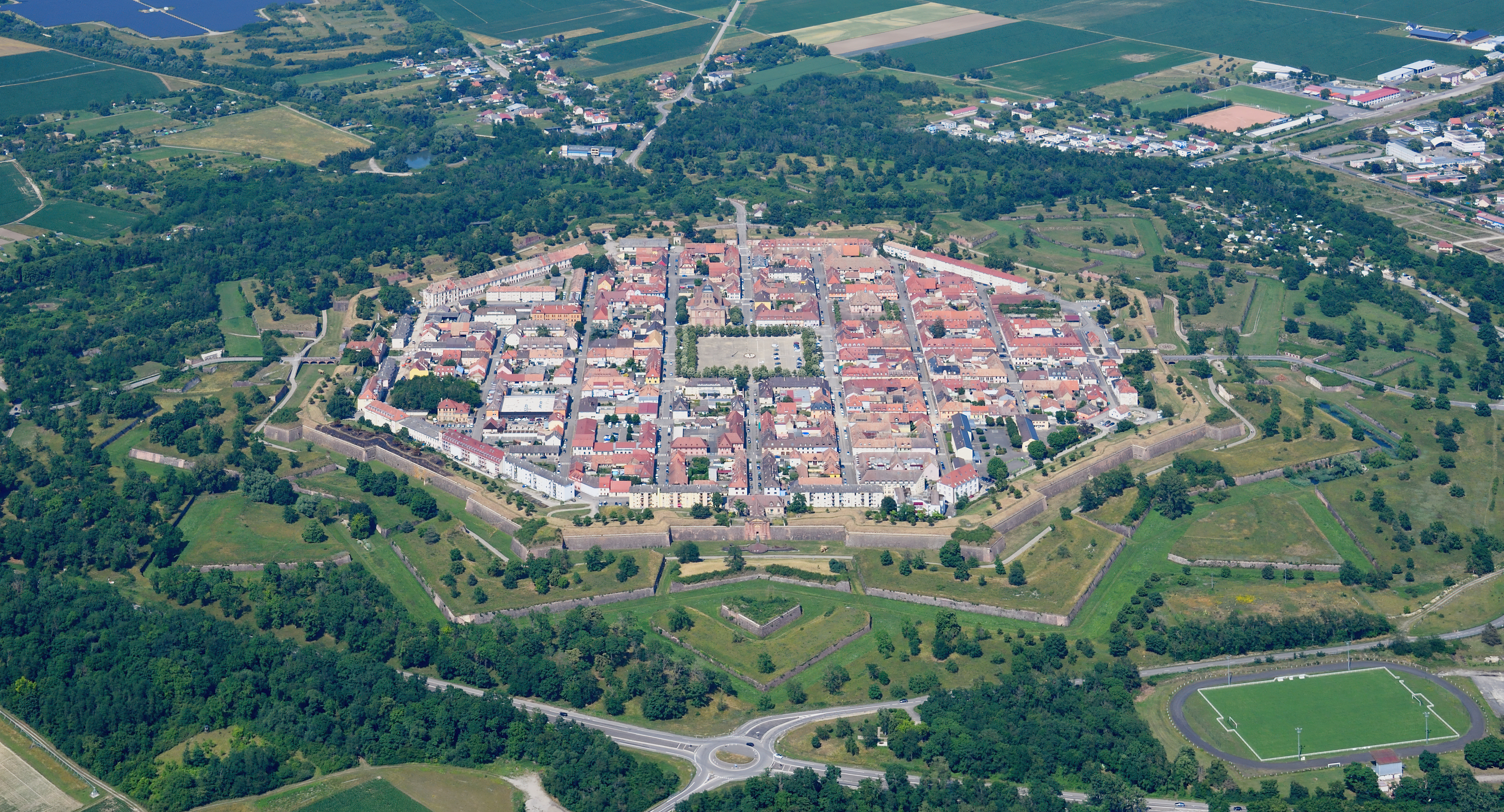
- An aerial photograph showing the layout of the town and the way it was built as a fortification

- Coat of arms
- Location of Neuf-Brisach
- Location within France Location within Grand Est
- Coordinates: 48°01′04″N 7°31′43″E
- Country: France
- Region: Grand Est
- Department: Haut-Rhin
- Arrondissement: Colmar-Ribeauvillé
- Canton: Ensisheim
- Intercommunality: Alsace Rhin Brisach

Government
  - Mayor (2020–2026): Richard Alvarez (DVD)
- Area^{1}: 1.33 km^{2} (0.51 sq mi)
- Elevation: 197 m (646 ft)
- Highest elevation: 198 m (650 ft)
- Lowest elevation: 194 m (636 ft)
- Population (2023): 1,895
  - Density: 1,420/km^{2} (3,690/sq mi)
- Time zone: UTC+01:00 (CET)
  - Summer (DST): UTC+02:00 (CEST)
- INSEE/Postal code: 68231 /68600
- ^{1} French Land Register data, which excludes lakes, ponds, glaciers > 1 km^{2} (0.386 sq mi or 247 acres) and river estuaries.

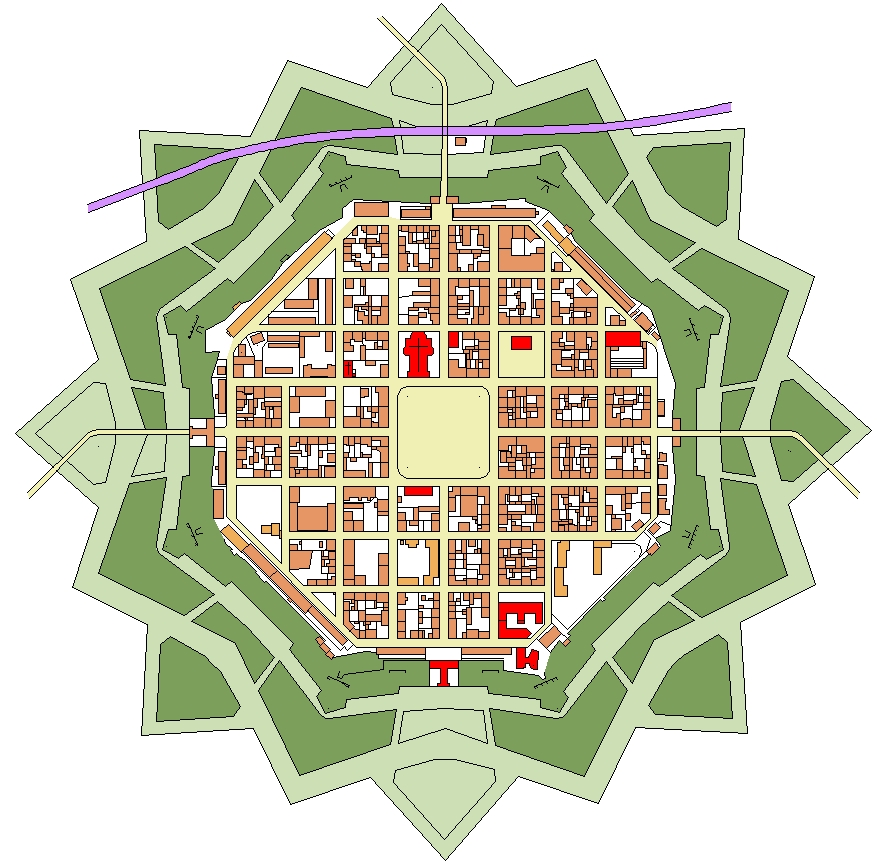
Layout of the fortified town

Neuf-Brisach (French pronunciation: [nœfbrizak] or [nøbrizak], lit. 'New Brisach'; Alsatian: Nei-Brisach) is a fortified town and commune of the department of Haut-Rhin in Alsace in north-eastern France. The fortified town was intended to guard the border between France and the Holy Roman Empire and, subsequently, the German states. It was built after the Treaty of Ryswick in 1697 that resulted in France losing the town of Breisach, on the opposite bank of the Rhine. The town's name means New Breisach.

The town is a UNESCO World Heritage Site because of quintessential military fortifications and its testimony to the influence of Vauban on military architecture during the 17–19th centuries.

== History ==
Work began on the fortified town in 1698, to plans drawn by Vauban, a military engineer at the service of Louis XIV. Vauban died in 1707 and this, his last work, was completed by Louis de Cormontaigne. The Neubreisacher canal was constructed to transport the necessary materials. The city's layout was that of an "ideal city", as was popular at the time, with a regular square grid street pattern inside an octagonal fortification. Generous space was given to a central square across the four blocks at the middle, flanked by an impressive church. Individual blocks were offered for private development, either as affluent houses in private gardens, or as properties for commercial rent. Simpler housing was provided in long tenement blocks, built inside each curtain wall, which also shielded the better houses from the risk of cannon fire. Access was provided by large gateways in the principal four curtain walls.

The fortifications are Vauban's final work and the culmination of his "third system." There are two lines of defence, an inner enceinte de sûreté, the bastion wall around the city, and an outer enceinte de combat, a system of concentric star-shaped earthworks. The curtain wall was largely octagonal, with each flank separated roughly into three and the outer bastion projecting slightly, so as to flank the centre of the walls. Each corner had a raised outwardly projecting pentagonal bastion tower, the highest points of the system. The outer earthworks were deep and occupied a greater area than the city itself. The inner walls were surrounded by tenailles before the centres of the curtain walls and counterguards before the bastions. In front of the centre of each curtain face was a large tetrahedral ravelin, those in front of the gateways also being topped by a reduit to the rear. Outside all of these earthworks was a covered way.

In the Franco-Prussian War, the city was bombarded by the Germans from 2 to 10 November 1870, when it capitulated. It suffered damage in World War II, but still represents a very clear example of the latest in fortification work at the beginning of the eighteenth century. During World War II, it was occupied by Germany, which operated a Dulag transit camp for up to 70,000 French prisoners of war.

In 2008, the ville neuve of Neuf-Brisach was listed as a UNESCO World Heritage Site as part of the Fortifications of Vauban group.

== People ==
- François-Joseph d'Offenstein (1760–1837), commandant in chief of the town during the French Revolutionary Wars
- Louis Schlaefli (born 1938), librarian
- Sébastien Le Prestre, Marquis of Vauban (1633–1707), military engineer who conceived the fortification of the city

== Gallery ==
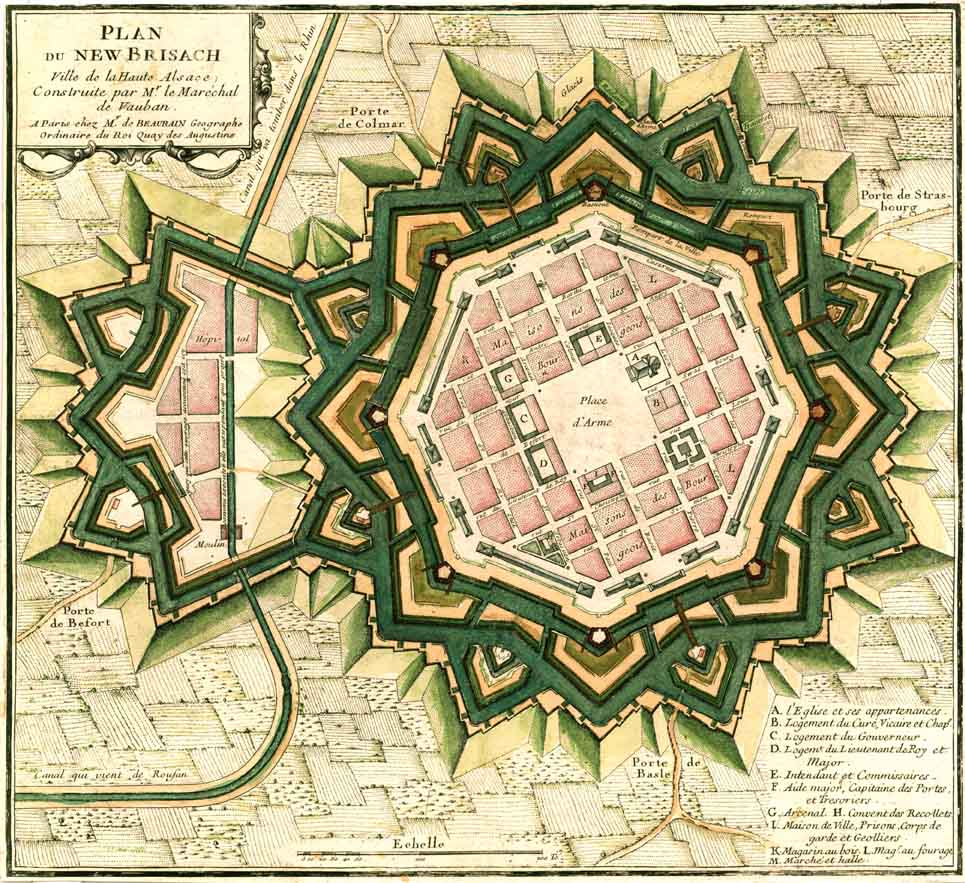
Plan of the city and fortifications

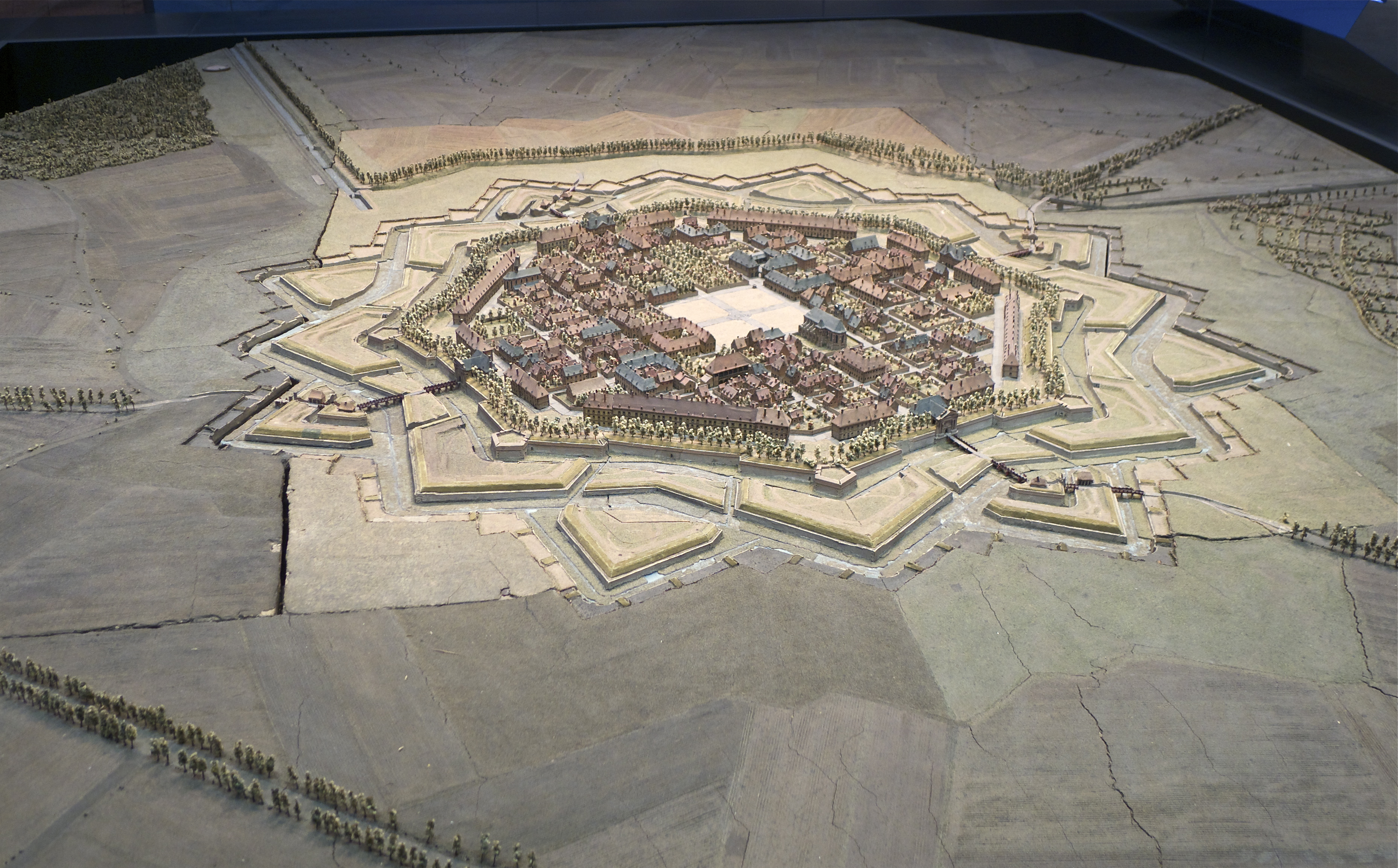
Plan-relief

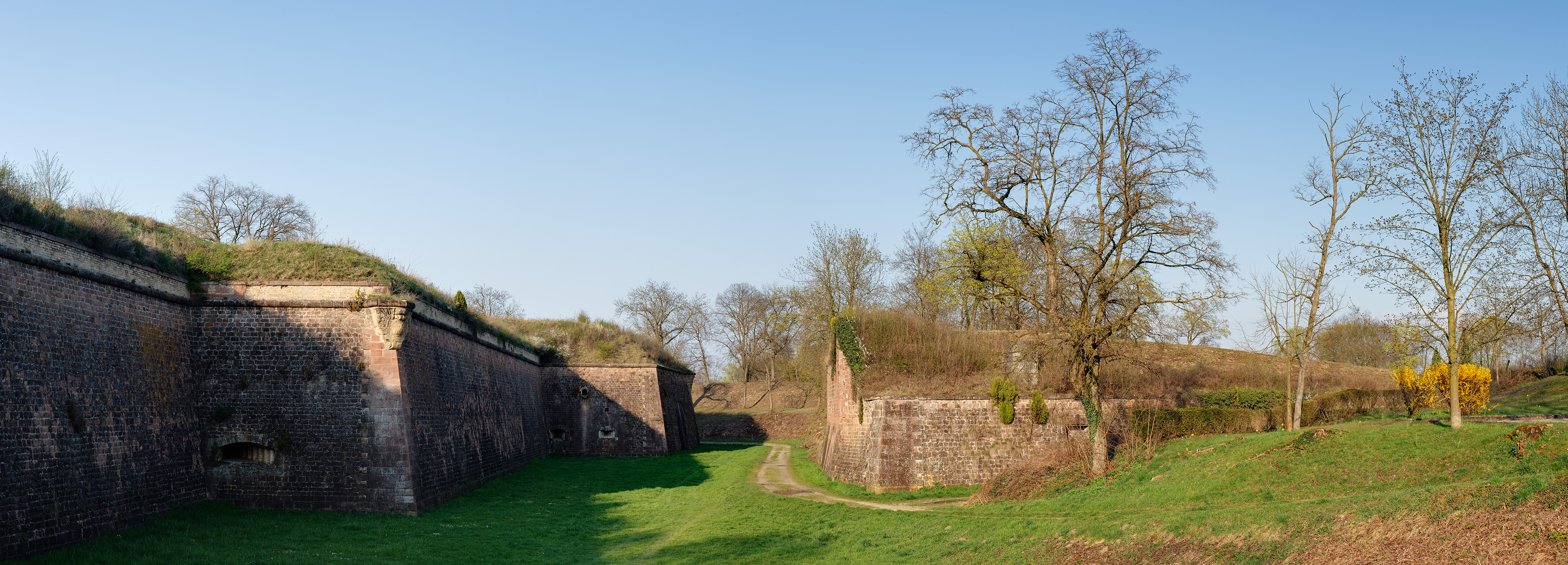
The moats and fortifications conceived by Vauban

== See also ==
- Communes of the Haut-Rhin department
- Fortress of St. Elizabeth
- Colmar Pocket
