= Jean-Marie Defrance =

French military officer and politician

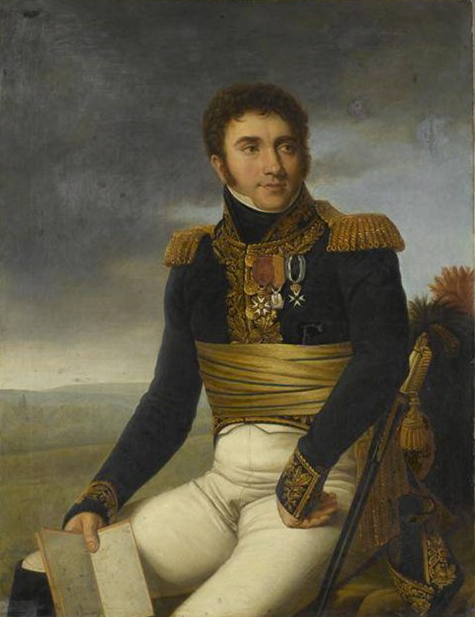
- Jean-Marie Defrance
- Born: 21 September 1771; Vassy, Champagne
- Died: 6 July 1835 (aged 63) Épinay-sur-Seine
- Allegiance: France
- Branch: French Revolutionary Army; French Imperial Army; French Royal Army
- Service years: 1792–1829
- Rank: General of Division
- Conflicts: Haitian Revolution; French Revolutionary Wars; Napoleonic Wars
- Awards: Officier of the Légion d'honneur
- Other work: Deputy to the National Convention; Council of Five Hundred

Jean-Marie Defrance (French pronunciation: [ʒɑ̃ maʁi dəfʁɑ̃s]; 1771–1835) was a French military officer and politician who was a General in the French Revolutionary Wars and the Napoleonic Wars. He was also a member of the Council of Five Hundred (the lower house of the legislative branch of the French government under The Directory), and a teacher at the military school of Rebais, Champagne.

Defrance had an extensive and successful military career in the French Revolutionary Wars and the Napoleonic Wars. After the First Battle of Zurich, he refused a battlefield promotion to brigadier general, asking instead for a cavalry regiment; he received command of the 12th Regiment of Chasseurs-a-Cheval (light cavalry) as Chef-de-Brigade, a rank equivalent to colonel. He led this brigade in the campaigns of 1799–1800 in southwestern Germany and northern Italy. By 1805, he had been promoted to brigadier general. At the Battle of Austerlitz and the Battle of Jena–Auerstedt, he commanded a cavalry brigade of carabiniers in Étienne Marie Antoine Champion de Nansouty's First Division. By the Battle of Borodino in September 1812, he had been promoted to general of division, commanding the 4th Cuirassier Division of Nansouty's reserves, where they charged the Shevardino redoubt. He fought his way across Germany to the Rhine River after the French loss at Leipzig and participated in the Six Days' Campaign.

In the Hundred Days, he commanded part of Jean Maximilien Lamarque's Army of the West. At the second Bourbon Restoration, he retained his titles and honours and subsequently held several command posts until retirement in 1829. He died in 1835.

== Family ==
Jean-Marie Defrance was born on 21 September 1771 at Vassy, in the Champagne province and died 6 July 1835. On his mother's side, he was the grandson of the French writer Pierre Chompré (1698 – 1760); his father, Jean-Claude Defrance, was the medical doctor at the Royal Military School of Rebais, in Champagne. Jean-Marie Defrance married the daughter of the richest jeweler in Paris, by the name Foncier.

== Military career ==
Defrance was stationed in Saint-Domingue during the first Haitian revolt and served in the volunteers Cape Dragoons. On his return to France in 1792, he was commissioned as a second lieutenant in the cavalry regiment royal-étranger. After serving in the Army of the North, he was appointed adjutant-general brigadier in the Army of Sambre and t-Meuse. He also served in the Council of Five Hundred.

Defrance also served in the Swiss Campaign of 1799 as divisional Chief of Staff of the 1st Division of Jean-Baptiste Jourdan's Army of the Danube; after the losses at the battles of Ostrach and Stockach in March 1799, the Army of the Danube was combined with the Army of Helvetia, under the command of André Massena. Defrance continued in his capacity as divisional chief of staff. At the First Battle of Zurich in June 1799, he was appointed on the field as brigadier general, an honor which he declined, asking instead to be given command of a cavalry regiment. He received command of the 12th Regiment of Chasseurs-a-Cheval. As Chef-de-Brigade, the equivalent of colonel in France's revolutionary-era field army, Defrance went to Italy and participated in the actions leading up to the Battle of Marengo. During the winter of 1800–1801, he campaigned in the Grisons in Switzerland and returned to France after the Treaty of Lunéville in 1801.

=== Career during the Napoleonic Wars ===
In 1803, with Napoleon's military reorganisation, the title Chef-de-Brigade reverted to colonel; Defrance retained his command of the 12th Regiment of Chasseurs-a-Cheval. He was named Officer of the Légion d'honneur on 14 June 1804. On 1 February 1805, he accepted a promotion to brigadier general and commanded a brigade in the Danube campaign against Austria and Russia at the battles of Ulm and Austerlitz.

Honors

- 14 June 1804, Officer Legion of Honor
- 1807, Chevalier (Knight), Order of the Lion of Bavaria
- 23 December 1807, Chevalier of the Order of Crown of Iron.
- 2 July 1808, Count of the Empire
- 17 January 1815, Grand officer of the Legion of Honor
- 24 August 1820, Commander of the Military Order of Saint Louis.
- 30 October 1829, Grand Cross of the Legion of Honor.

In 1806, he campaigned against Kingdom of Prussia and Russia at the Battle of Jena–Auerstedt. There, and at the Battle of Friedland on 14 June 1807, he commanded a carabinier brigade—the first and second regiments—in Étienne Marie Antoine Champion de Nansouty's First Division. Napoleon raised him to Count of the Empire on 2 July 1808. At the Battle of Wagram (1809), he again commanded the carabinier brigade.

The confiscation of the Prussian cavalry and draft stock required supervision to integrate the acquisitions into the Grande Armée. After completing several terms as an inspector general of cavalry, Defrance was appointed general of division in August 1811 and joined Joachim Murat's Cavalry in February 1812 for Napoleon's Invasion of Russia. At the Battle of Borodino, he commanded 4th Cuirassier Division, which included three brigades and two horse artillery units of 12 guns. These were assigned to Nansouty's Reserves and assaulted the Shevardino redoubt on 5–6 September.

During the Saxon campaign, Defrance was appointed Inspector General for the Grande Armée. He also commanded the 4th Heavy Cavalry Division at the Battle of Leipzig in October 1813, and one of his brigades remained at Lindenau to cover a possible retreat.

In January 1814, for the last few months of Napoleon's rule, Defrance commanded four regiments of Imperial Guard and fought in the action of 11 February at Montmirail, during the Six Days' Campaign. On 7 March, with much smaller force than his opponent, he repulsed the Russian assault at Rheims, but on 12 March was forced to relinquish the city as more Coalition troops arrived. The following day, he attacked the Russian cavalry, but was again forced to withdraw when faced with superior numbers.

== Late military career ==
During the first Bourbon Restoration, Louis XVIII appointed Defrance as inspector general of cavalry. During the Hundred Days, Napoleon's brief return to France, Jean-Marie Defrance commanded the cavalry element of the Army of the West. Under overall command of Jean Maximilien Lamarque, one of Napoleon's fiercest supporters, it was formed to suppress potential Royalist insurrection in the Vendée region of France. Defrance did not participate in the Battle of Rocheserviere, in which Lemarque's army brutally crushed the anticipated Vendéen uprising. He remained instead at his post of the 18th military division, inspecting the cavalry depots in the upper Loire. Defrance retained his rank after the second restoration and commanded the First Military Division in Paris from 1819 to 1822. He also taught at the military school in Rebais.

Defrance's name is engraved on the east side of the Arc de Triomphe.

Military offices
Preceded by Dominique-Andre De Neil; Chef de Brigade 1793–1799	12th Regiment of Chasseurs-a-Cheval; 1799–1805; Colonel 1803–1805; Chef de Brigade 1799–1803	Succeeded by Claude-Raymond Guyon
