= Dominique Mansuy Roget =

French general (1760–1832)

Dominique-Mansuy Roget de Belloquet
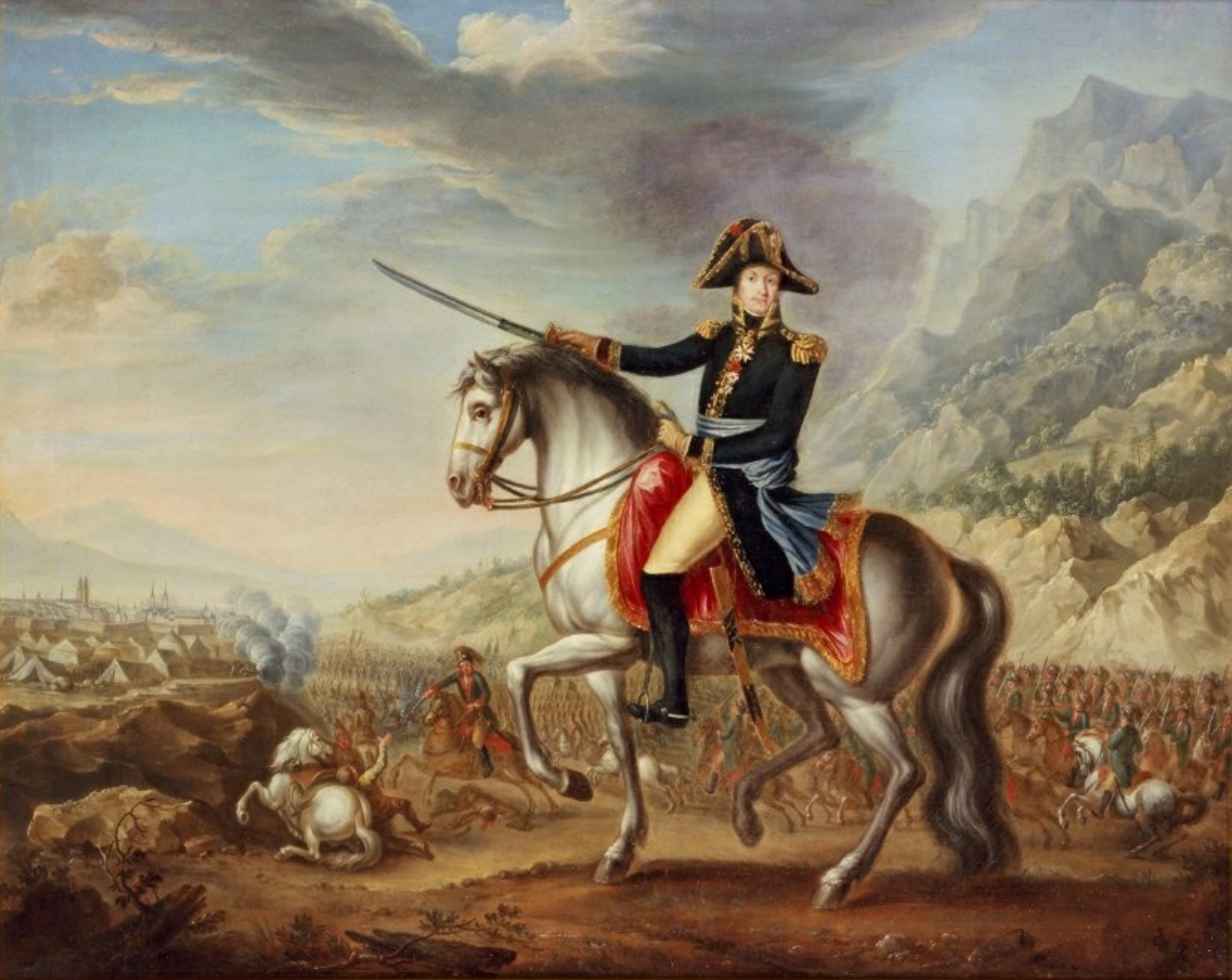
- Equestrian portrait, c. 1800 (Swiss National Museum)
- Born: 20 October 1760; Lorry-devant-le-Pont, Lorraine, France
- Died: 9 January 1832 (aged 71) Rémelfing, Moselle, France
- Allegiance: France
- Branch: Army
- Service years: 1777–1818
- Rank: General of division
- Conflicts: French Revolutionary Wars; Napoleonic Wars
- Awards: Commander, Legion of Honour; Order of St. Louis; Baron of the Empire

Dominique-Mansuy Roget de Belloquet, knight and later baron Belloguet (French pronunciation: [dɔminik mɑ̃sɥi ʁɔʒɛ də bɛlɔkɛ]; 20 October 1760 – 9 January 1832), was a French general of the French Revolutionary Wars and the Napoleonic Wars. He embraced a military career at the age of 17, and progressed through the ranks of service. In 1808, he was appointed to the 3rd Division in Metz, where he remained until his retirement in 1814. He was among the first recipients of the Legion of Honour in 1804.

== Service ==
Born on 20 October 1760 at Lorry-Devant-le-Pont, in the Kingdom of France, Roget entered military service in the 7th regiment of chasseurs à cheval (light cavalry), on 13 May 1777, as a simple trooper. In 1793, as a sous-lieutenant he served in Custine's army at the Siege of Mainz. Later he served with Marceau-Desgraviers and Kléber to quell the Vendée uprising. By the end of uprising in the Vendee, he had reached the grade of adjutant general. Recalled to the Army of the Rhine and Moselle, General Louis Desaix gave him command of the 13th Dragoon Regiment, which had achieved battle honors at Valmy four years earlier; at the Battle of Dierstein, he led the 13th in a charge and defeated the Austrian Regiment D'Alton, taking two flags and five cannons. He then turned to Offenburg, where he chased out the Austrians and pursued them beyond Gengenbach; in the second action, he took four guns from the Austrians, as well as forty boxes of ammunition, and a large number of prisoners.

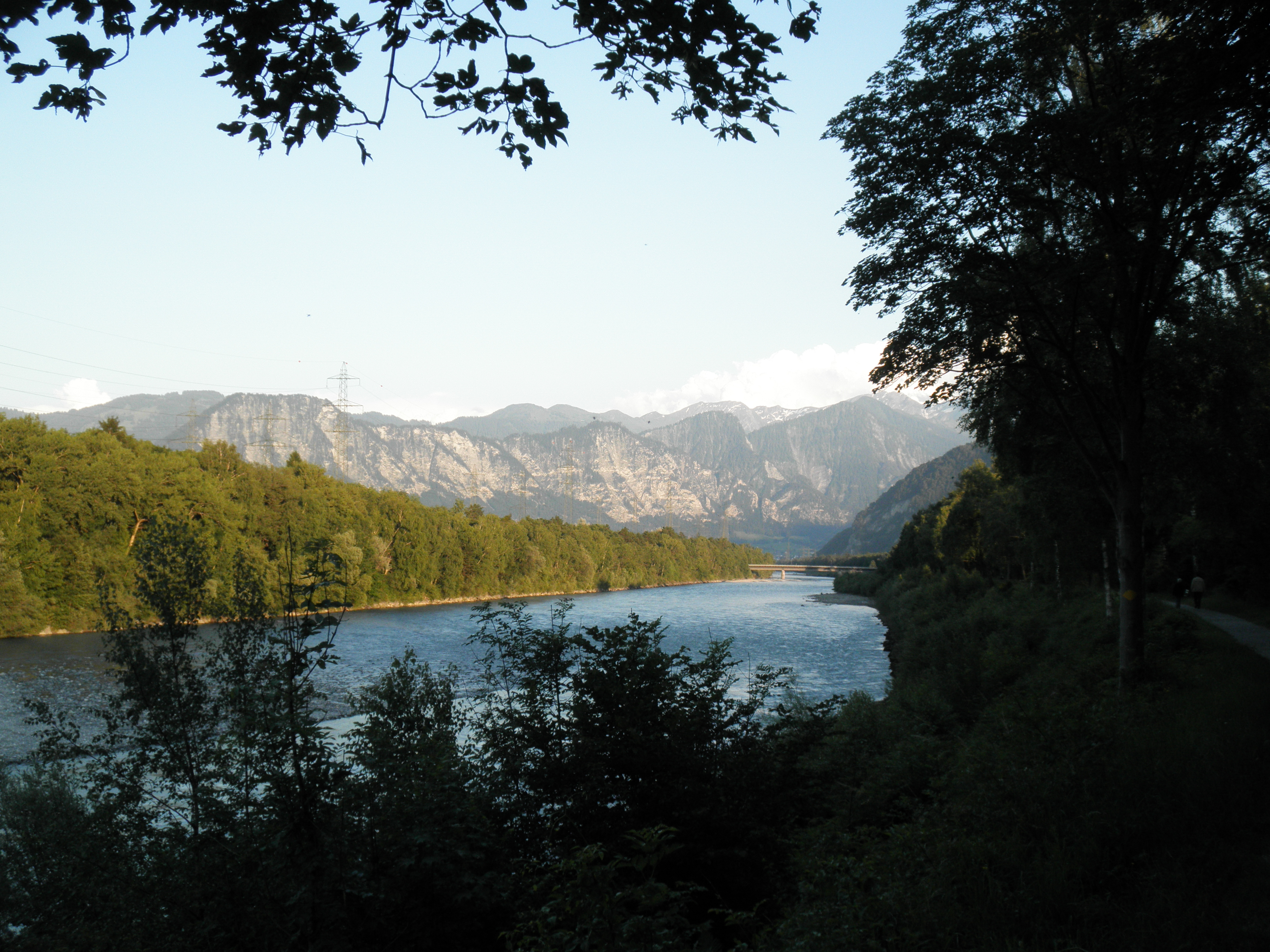
The Alpine Rhine, although near the source of the river, is wide and difficult to cross under flood conditions.

In the Swiss Campaign of 1799, under overall command of André Masséna, he led the 13th Dragoons in Brigadier General Oudinot's division in the Alpine Rhine (the Rhine between Switzerland and Liechtenstein). He was instructed to cross the Rhine at a ford near Verdenberg. The sudden rise of the river made this impractical and several troopers drowned in the attempt. Colonel Roget led his regiment across the river under fire from Habsburg sharpshooters concealed on the other side; having reached the east bank, he ordered the remaining dragons on the far bank to bring the artillery across. Under the cover of artillery fire, Roget drove the Austrian defenders back past the village of Eschen. The next day, after a lively fight, Colonel Roget led a successful cavalry charge against the Regiment O'Donnell and Regiment Modena, taking a number of prisoners, five cannons, and 200 horses. Subsequently, he was promoted to general of brigade. In 1799, under command of Michel Ney, he participated in the Battle of Winterthur.

He commanded the 13th Dragoons (after 4 March 1797). He fought at the Battle of Austerlitz, where he also commanded the 10th and 11th dragoons, of Walther's division. By 30 December 1806, he had been promoted to general of division and in 1808, he commanded the 3rd division at Metz. In January 1813, the Allied offensive had reached the border regions between the German states and France. In anticipation of invasion, Marshal Marmont investigated all preparations for the defense of Metz, and found the state of troops and defenses lacking. He accused Roget of gross incompetence, and removed him from his post as military commander of Metz, appointing Durutte in his place. Upon the Bourbon Restoration, Roget retired to Remelfing where he died on 9 January 1832.

== Honors ==
On 14 June 1804, he was named Commander of the Legion of Honor, being among the first recipients of that award. On 22 October 1810, Napoleon I declared him Baron of the Empire.

== Family ==
Roget married Marie Françoise Josephine Bourste. They had three children: Dominique-François-Louis, Marie-Antoine-Françoise Susanne, and Napoleon-Henri-Joseph.
