= Frédéric Henri Walther =

French general of division

Frederic-Louis-Henri Walther
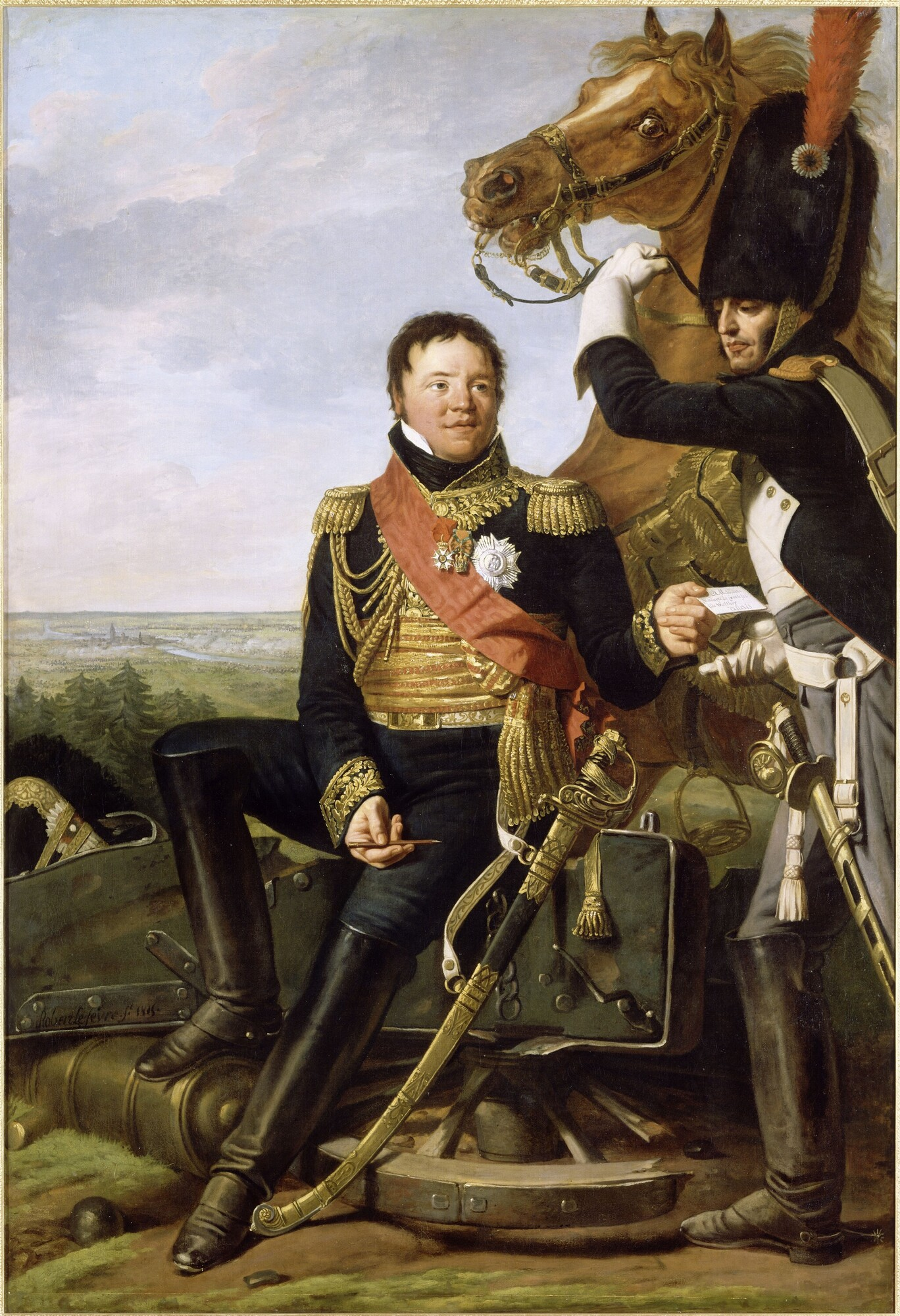
- Walther hands a message to a grenadier, in a portrait by Robert Lefèvre (1815)
- Born: 20 June 1761; Obenheim, Alsace, France
- Died: 24 November 1813 (aged 52) Kusel, Sarre, France
- Allegiance: France
- Branch: French Army
- Service years: 1781–1813
- Rank: Général de division
- Conflicts: War of the First Coalition; War of the Second Coalition; Napoleonic Wars
- Awards: Grand Eagle, Legion of Honor; Order of the Iron Crown; Count of the Empire; Eastern Pillar, Column 16, Arc de Triomphe

Frédéric-Louis-Henri, comte de Walther (20 June 1761 – 24 November 1813), was a French general of division and a supporter of Napoleon Bonaparte. He fought in the Revolutionary and Napoleonic wars.

He enlisted in 1781 and, in his 30-year career, he saw action at the major battles in Europe. He fought in André Masséna's Army of Switzerland, where he participated in the Winterthur and First and Second Battles of Zürich, the campaigns of 1806 against Prussia, and Napoleon's invasion of Russia. After the Russian and Saxon campaign, while suffering from exhaustion, he contracted typhus and died in Kusel, in the Saarland. He was buried at the Panthéon, and his name is listed on the Arc de Triomphe in Paris.

== Family ==
Walther was the son of Georges Henri Walther, a Lutheran pastor, and Marie Elisabeth Chatel of Montbéliard. He was born in Obenheim, in the Alsace region of the Bas-Rhin. His cousins, Frédéric Cuvier and Georges Cuvier, were naturalists and zoologists. He married 20-year-old Salome-Louise Coulman on 12 April 1802. They had two daughters, born 1803 and 1807; in 1810, a third child was still-born.

Initially he enlisted as a simple soldier in the Berchény Hussars. This unit was included in the 1791 reorganization, and became the 1st Regiment of Hussars. On 10 May 1792, he received a commission as a lieutenant.

== Military career ==
During the War of the First Coalition, he was active at the battle of Neerwinden and the campaign on the Piave River in northern Italy. During these campaigns, he proved equally adept at leading heavy or light cavalry, although some military analysts consider he was a better heavy cavalry leader. In 1793, he was promoted to general of brigade.

In the War of the Second Coalition, he participated in the French defeats at Ostrach and Stockach in March 1799, and served under the newly promoted Michel Ney on the forward line of defense of the Swiss city of Zürich. At the Battle of Winterthur, he directed the rear guard action covering Ney's retreat through Winterthur, holding a key bridge cross of the Tōss River for 90 minutes against a larger Austrian force under command of Friedrich Freiherr von Hotze.

A few days later, he was present for the defeat at the First Battle of Zürich when André Masséna withdrew the entire French force across the Limmat river. In September 1799, he was present at the Second Battle of Zürich when Masséna's Army of Helvetia and Army of the Danube crushed Alexander Rimsky-Korsakov's Russian force; he actively harried the fleeing Russians. He later fought at the Battle of Messkirch in 1800.

=== Napoleonic Wars ===
During the War of the Third Coalition, he participated in the Ulm Campaign, in which cavalry played an essential part. He participated in French victories at Hohenlinden and later at Austerlitz, where he commanded the 2nd Dragoon Division in Marshal Joachim Murat's Cavalry Reserve. His division was a key to Soult's successful attack on the Russian center. He suffered wounds at both these battles and after the latter, he received le Grand Aigle de la Légion d'honneur (Grand Eagle of the Legion of Honor), and appointed Chamberlain to the Emperor. Subsequently, he was decorated as a Commander of the Order of the Iron Crown, and appointed as Colonel of the Grenadiers à Cheval (mounted grenadiers), of the Imperial Guard, in 1806, a position he held until his death 1813.

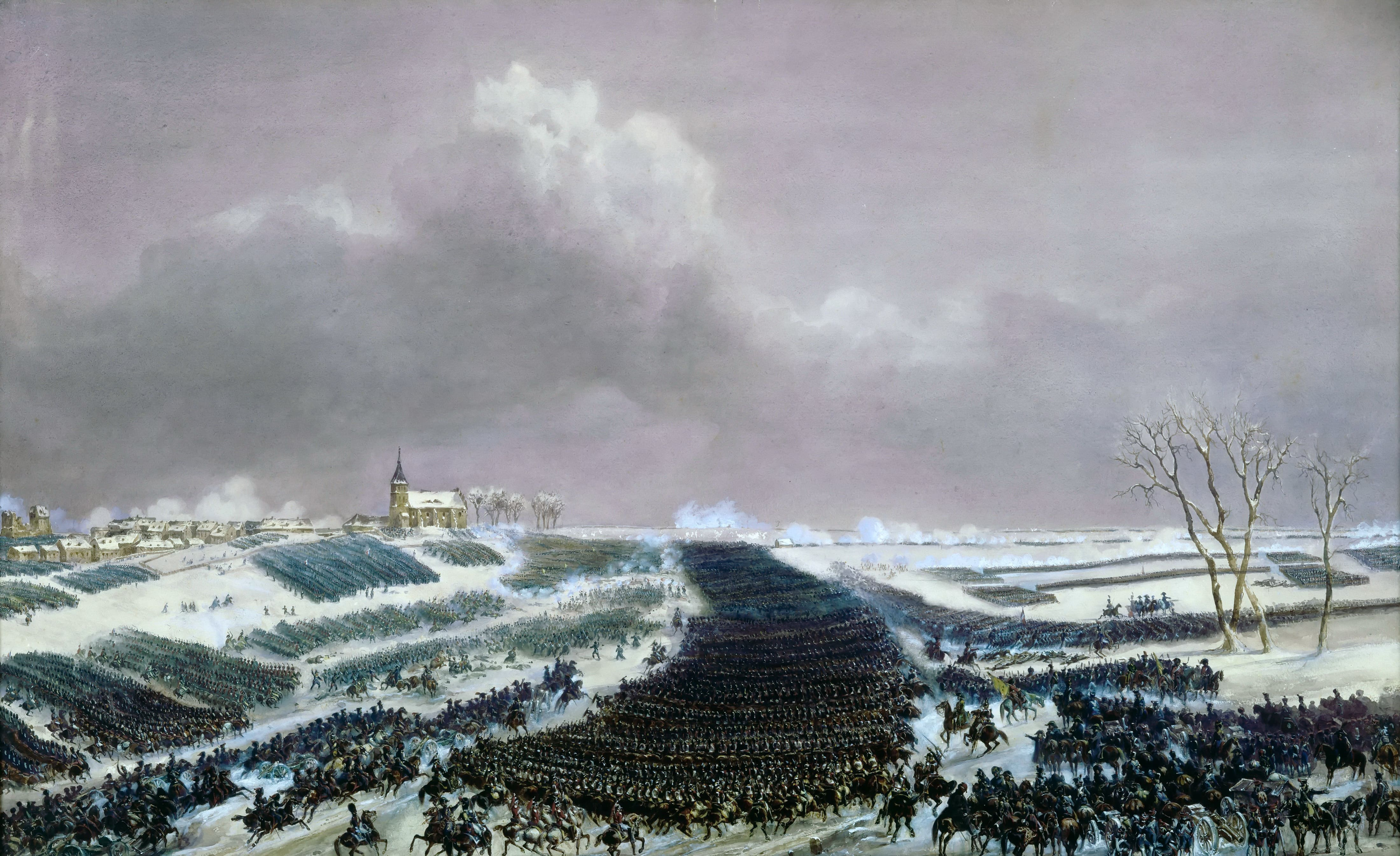
The French cavalry charges the Russian line at Eylau, depicted by Siméon Fort

At the Battle of Eylau in February 1807, he led his dragoons in Murat's famous 10,000-man cavalry charge depicted by Jean Antoine Siméon Fort, the 19th century history painter. At the Battle of Wagram (July 1809) Walther commanded four squadrons of Grenadiers à Cheval of Jean-Baptiste Bessières's Imperial Guard Cavalry. As the battle was turning to the Austrians' favour, Bessières launched a massive cavalry charge with the combined elements of the Cavalry Reserve Corps and the cavalry of the Imperial Guard. After a first, precipitated charge, Bessières was wounded and incapacitated, and the whole cavalry attack was suspended. Napoleon then launched a major infantry attack with Jacques MacDonald's infantry and considerable cavalry support, including the Guard cavalry under Walther. After the battle, MacDonald accused Walther of failure to mobilize his cavalrymen quickly enough and not charging when the time was right. Walther accompanied Napoleon to Russia as a commander of the light cavalry of the Imperial Guard, part of which rotated duties as Napoleon's honor guard.

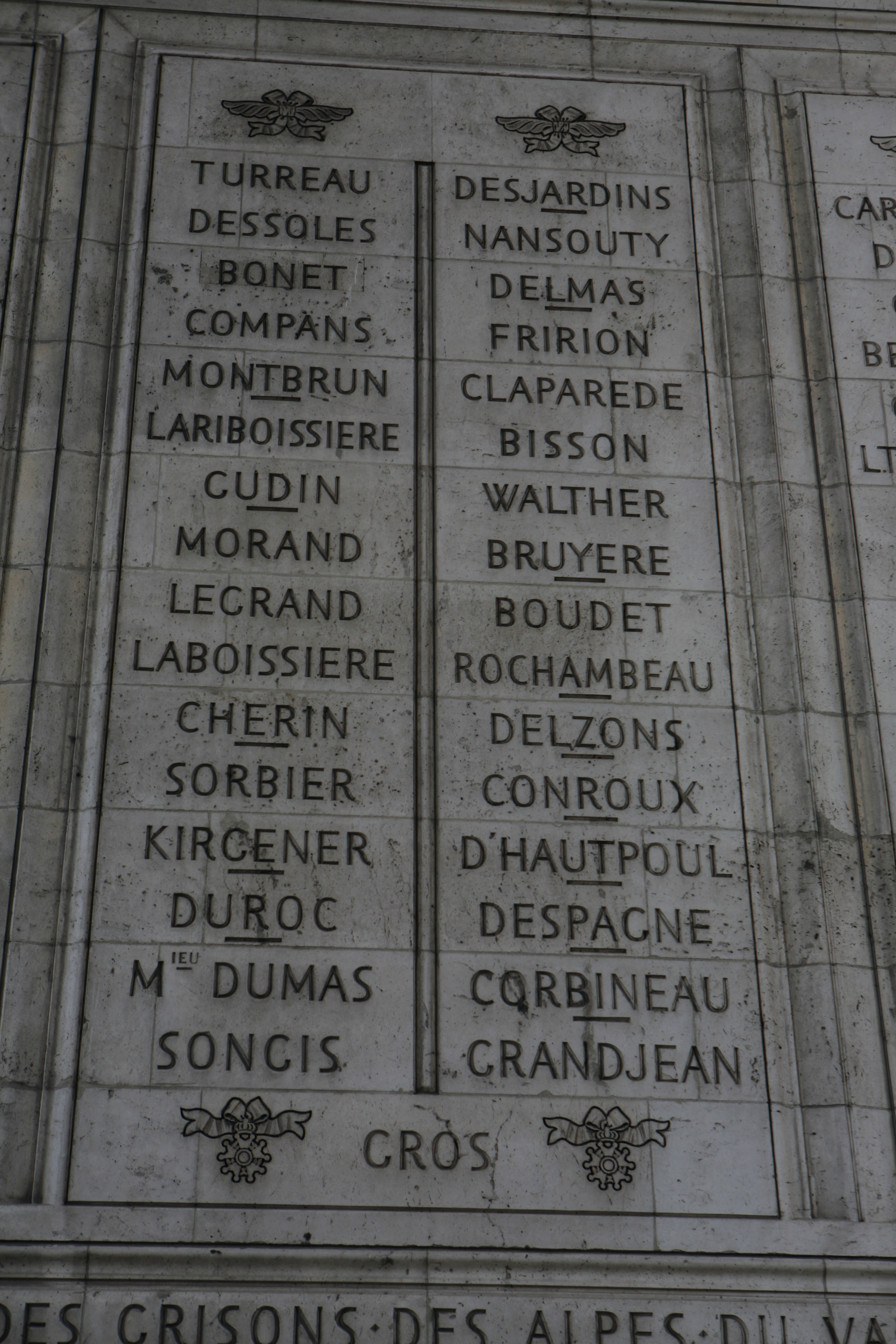
Walther's name is inscribed on the Arc de Triomphe (7th from the top on the right).

During the Saxon campaign of 1813, Walther continued command of the Guard Cavalry, and was present at the Battle of Lützen and Battle of Dresden, as commander of the Guard cavalry. At the Second Battle of Kulm (17 September 1813), he commanded the Imperial Guard Cavalry including the dragoons, Grenadiers à Cheval, and 1st (Polish) and 2nd (Dutch) Lancers. At the Battle of Leipzig, he commanded the 3rd Division of the cavalry of the Imperial Guard: The total cavalry of the Guard included 7,903 men and 18 guns. After refitting and resupply at Erfurt, where Napoleon had stashed a large depot of arms and ammunition, the French army continued to withdraw through western Germany, toward the Rhine.

The Battle of Hanau, 30–31 October 1813, was Walther's last major action. He commanded the 3rd Division of the Young Guard, including the four squadrons of mounted grenadiers, the Dragoons, the Chasseurs à Cheval, and the mounted Polish Lancers; he also had charge of Napoleon's honor guard of five squadrons, and two field artillery battalions. By this time, Walther was suffering from exhaustion. He collapsed and died in the night of 24 November 1813, in Kusel. Sources differ on whether he died of exhaustion or typhus, or a combination of both. His body was transported first to the cathedral in Metz and from there to Paris, escorted by a detachment of the Imperial Guard. He was buried in the Pantheon. His name appears on the Arc de Triomphe in Paris.

== Sources ==
=== Bibliography ===
- Atteridge, Andrew. The Bravest of the Brave, Michel Ney: Marshal of France, Duke of Elchingen. New York: Brentano, 1913.
- Broughton, Tony. The Garde Imperiale and Its Commanders during the Period 1804 – 1815. Part I: The Cavalry Regiments, Regiment de Grenadiers-a-Cheval de la Garde Imperiale. Napoleon Series. Robert Burnham, editor in chief. Accessed 29 January 2010.
- (in French) Dubois, Jocelyn. "Frederic-Louis-Henri Walther." Les Protestants. André Encrevé (ed.), Paris: Beauchesne, 1993, ISBN 2-7010-1261-9
- Rothenberg, Gunther E. (2005). The emperor's last victory : Napoleon and the Battle of Wagram. London: Cassell Military. ISBN 0304367117. LCCN 2006491419.
- Senior, Terry J. "Top 20 French Cavalry Commanders: #7 Frederic-Louis-Henri Walther." Napoleon Series.org, Robert Burnham, editor in chief. Accessed 28 January 2010.
- Shadwell, Lawrence. Mountain Warfare Illustrated by the Campaign of 1799 in Switzerland: Being a Translation of the Swiss Narrative.... London: Henry S. King, 1875.
