= Étienne Marie Chompré =

French writer

Étienne Marie Chompré (1701–1784) was an 18th-century French writer. He wrote a Recueil de Fables et des Réflexions sur les attributs de la Fable.

His brother was Pierre Chompré, his nephew Nicolas Maurice Chompré.
