= Goussainville, Eure-et-Loir =

Goussainville
- Commune
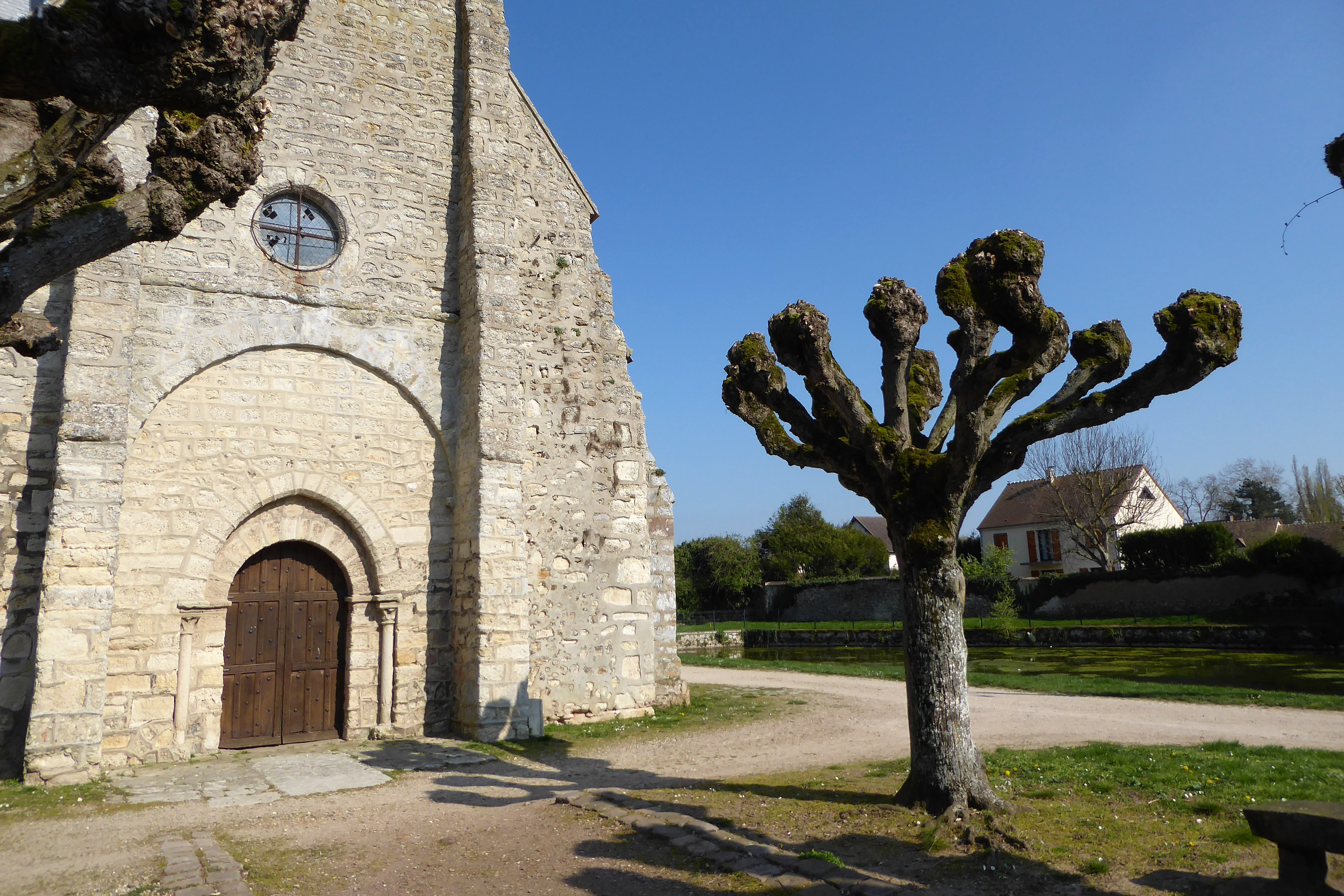
- The church in Goussainville
- Location of Goussainville
- Location within France Location within Centre-Val de Loire
- Coordinates: 48°46′37″N 1°33′19″E
- Country: France
- Region: Centre-Val de Loire
- Department: Eure-et-Loir
- Arrondissement: Dreux
- Canton: Anet
- Intercommunality: Pays houdanais

Government
  - Mayor (2020–2026): Michel Cadot
- Area^{1}: 10.83 km^{2} (4.18 sq mi)
- Elevation: 134 m (440 ft)
- Highest elevation: 137 m (449 ft)
- Lowest elevation: 87 m (285 ft)
- Population (2023): 1,335
  - Density: 123.3/km^{2} (319.3/sq mi)
- Time zone: UTC+01:00 (CET)
  - Summer (DST): UTC+02:00 (CEST)
- INSEE/Postal code: 28185 /28410
- ^{1} French Land Register data, which excludes lakes, ponds, glaciers > 1 km^{2} (0.386 sq mi or 247 acres) and river estuaries.

Goussainville (French pronunciation: [ɡusɛ̃vil]) is a commune in the Eure-et-Loir department in northern France. In January 2015 it merged with the former commune of Champagne.

== Population ==
Historical population
Year	Pop.	±% p.a.
1968	457	—
1975	480	+0.70%
1982	590	+2.99%
1990	840	+4.51%
1999	913	+0.93%
2007	1,072	+2.03%
2012	1,258	+3.25%
2017	1,292	+0.53%
2023	1,335	+0.55%
Source: Population in geography as of January 2025, INSEE

== See also ==
- Communes of the Eure-et-Loir department
