= Friedrich Joseph, Count of Nauendorf =

Austrian general and field marshal of the French Revolutionary Wars

Friedrich August Joseph, Count of Nauendorf
- Born: 3 August 1749; Heilsdorf, Saxon Vogtland
- Died: 30 December 1801 (aged 52) Troppau, Austrian Silesia
- Allegiance: Habsburg monarchy
- Branch: Colonel-Proprietor (Inhaber), 8th Hussar Regiment (1799 – 30 December 1801)
- Service years: 1763–1801
- Rank: Feldmarschall-leutnant
- Conflicts: War of the Bavarian Succession; Austro-Turkish War of 1787; French Revolutionary Wars; War of the First Coalition; War of the Second Coalition
- Awards: Knights Cross of the Military Order of Maria Theresa 19 May 1779; Commanders Cross of the Military Order of Maria Theresa 18 December 1795.

Friedrich Joseph of Nauendorf, a general in Habsburg service during the French Revolutionary Wars, was noted for his intrepid and daring cavalry raids. Like most Austrian officers of the French Revolutionary Wars, he joined the military as a young man, and served in the War of Bavarian Succession. In the war's opening action, he successfully repelled a Prussian border raid, which earned him the admiration of the Empress Maria Theresa's son, Joseph. His continued success in the Habsburg border wars with the Ottoman Empire added to his reputation as a commander.

In the Wars of the First and Second Coalitions, his forces were vital to the successful relief of Mainz, and his commands captured the French siege train and most of the supplies during the French evacuation. In the campaigns in Swabia (1799), he commanded the advanced guard, and later the center of the main column at the Battle of Stockach on 25 March 1799. At the First Battle of Zürich in 1799, he commanded the right wing in the Austrian victory of André Masséna's force. After the Swabian and Swiss campaigns, he retired in poor health, and died in 1801.

== Early career ==
Born in the village of Heilsdorf, in the Saxon Vogtland, 3 August 1749, Nauendorf came from a family of minor Saxon aristocracy and Prussian state administrators. His grandfather was a states' attorney in Jena. His father, Freiherr (Baron) Carl Georg Christian Nauendorf, was a cavalry officer in Habsburg military service in the Seven Years' War, and was present at the Battle of Kolín. He was also part of Baron Ernst Gideon von Laudon's army on 30 September – 1 October 1761, when Laudon led the force in the storming of Schweidnitz.

Nauendorf joined the 8th Hussar Regiment in 1763. In 1766, his father became Colonel and Proprietor (Inhaber) of the regiment; upon his father's death in 1775, Dagobert Sigmund von Wurmser became Colonel and Inhaber, and the Regiment became known as 8th Hussar Wurmser, or Wurmser's Hussars.

=== War in Bohemia and Silesia ===
In 1778, Nauendorf was a Rittmeister (captain of cavalry) of the Wurmser Hussar Regiment, and stationed near the border of Bohemia and Prussia, by Pressburg (present-day Bratislava), the regiment's peacetime garrison. At the end of the year, the Duke of Bavaria, Maximilian III Joseph, Elector of Bavaria, died unexpectedly of smallpox. As the last of the Bavarian Wittelsbach dynasty, descended from 13th century Holy Roman Emperor Louis the Bavarian, Maximilian was related to most of the German houses, and Bavaria was strategically located to entice the Habsburgs, chiefly Archduke and co-Regent Joseph, to covet the duchy. Tensions rose between and among the princes of the German states, principally Elector of Saxony, King of Prussia, and Joseph; their diplomats shuttled between courts to resolve problems raised by the Bavarian Succession crisis, while Frederick II of Prussia, Frederick August of Saxony and Joseph of Austria moved their extensive armies into position in Bohemia.

In early July 1778, the Prussian General Johann Jakob von Wunsch (1717–1788) crossed into Bohemia near the fortified town of Náchod, in the opening action of the War of the Bavarian Succession. Nauendorf had only 50 Hussars, but they sallied from their garrison to engage the larger Prussian force. Encountering Wunsch, Nauendorf greeted the old Prussian general and his men as friends; by the time the Prussians realized the allegiance of the Hussars, Nauendorf and his small force had acquired the strategic advantage. Following a brief skirmish, Wunsch withdrew. The next day Nauendorf was promoted to major. In a letter to her son, Joseph, the Empress Maria Theresa wrote: "They say you are so pleased with the rookie Nauendorf, the Carlstätter or Hungarian who killed seven men, that you gave him 12 ducats." Enamored with the possibility of acquiring Bavaria, Joseph encouraged successful raids against the Prussian troops. On 7 August 1778, with two squadrons of his regiment, Nauendorf led a raid against a Prussian convoy at Biebersdorf in the County of Kladsko. The surprised convoy surrendered, and Nauendorf captured its officers, 110 men, 476 horses, 240 wagons of flour, and 13 transport wagons.

In another raid, on 17–18 January 1779, Nauendorf's commander, Dagobert von Wurmser advanced into the County of Glatz in five columns, surrounded Habelschwerdt, stormed the village. In a subsequent assault on the so-called Swedish blockhouse in Oberschwedeldorf (now Szalejów Górny), it and the village of Habelschwerdt were set on fire by howitzers. In total, the raid resulted in the capture of Prince Adolf of Hesse-Philippsthal and over 1,000 men, three cannon and ten colors. Wurmser's forward patrols reached the outskirts of Glatz, and patrolled much of Silesia's border with Prussia, near Schweidnitz. Halberschwerdt and Oberschedeldorf were both destroyed.

On 3 March 1779, Nauendorf raided the Berbersdorf again, this time with a larger force of infantry and hussars, and took the entire Prussian garrison as prisoner. Following this action, Joseph, now Emperor, awarded him the Knight's Cross of the Military Order of Maria Theresa (19 May 1779). This kind of action characterized the entire war; there were no major battles. The armies of the opposing sides conducted series of raids and counter-raids from which they lived off the country-side and tried to deny each other access to supplies and fodder.

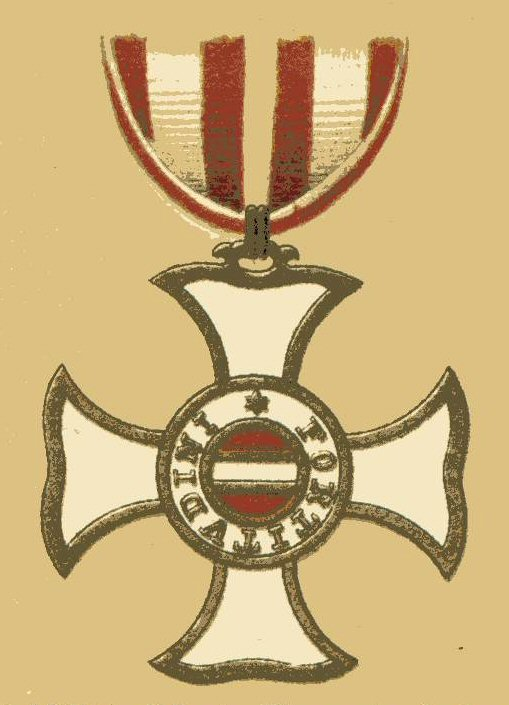
Badge of the Order of Maria Theresa. Nauendorf received this award for his successful raids on Prussian outposts in Saxony in the Potato War.

=== Action in the border war ===
Nauendorf served with the Habsburg forces during the Ottoman wars from 1787 to 1791. On 19–20 October 1788, near Tomaševac (present day Serbia), Nauendorf routed 1,200 of the elite Sipahis with two squadrons of hussars. On 23 October 1788, with only six squadrons of hussars, he attacked the Turkish rearguard in the village of Pančevo, in the Banat, during which the Turkish commander was mortally wounded. On 16 September 1789, he led the successful raid on the island of Borecs in the Danube, which garnered greatly needed supplies from the Turkish forces. On 9 November of that year, he led four squadrons of his regiment to capture Gladova, 10 miles (16 km) from the so-called Iron Gate of the Danube. Nauendorf was awarded command of 30th Hussar Regiment Wurmser, as the so-called second colonel, who functioned as an executive officer. On 12 March 1779, Joseph elevated Nauendorf to the rank of Count, or Graf.

== Austrian action on the Rhine ==
Promotions

- joined Hussars: 1763
- Rittmeister (captain of cavalry): 1778
- Major: 7 July 1778
- Lt. Colonel: 1784
- Colonel: 1789
- Major General: 16 March 1793 (effective 4 December 1791)
- Feldmarschall-leutnant: 1 March 1797 (effective 22 January 1797)

In 1792, Nauendorf's regiment served on the lower (northern) Rhine river and at Trier on the Moselle river in the French Revolutionary Wars. In December of that year, his regiment successfully defended Pellingen, Merzkirchen and Oberleuken from the attacks of General of Division La Baroliére's Army of the Moselle.

In 1795, Nauendorf served in Field Marshal Charles Joseph de Croix, Count of Clerfayt's Army of the Lower Rhine, which relieved Mainz. On 10 October, a portion of the Corps of Observation had surprised the French at Hochst; Jourdan was withdrawing his force from the blockade of Mainz. On 13 October, Nauendorf, commander of part of Count Clerfayt's Corps of Observation, sent his cavalry across the Main River, with the infantry following in boats; they surprised and overwhelmed Jourdan's rear guard at Niederhausen, capturing five guns, 30+ wagons and 80 ammunition caissons. On 29 October, Nauendorf captured most of the French siege train and supply wagons evacuated from Mainz. Finally, in that year on 6 November, his victory at Rochenhausen prevented the unification of the French armies of the Rhin-et-Moselle and the Sambre-et-Meuse.

During the maneuvers leading to the Battle of Amberg on 24 August 1796, Nauendorf's cavalry reconnaissance discovered crucial intelligence, after which he sent Archduke Charles the message: "If your Royal Highness will or can advance 12,000 men against Jourdan's rear, he is lost." After the Austrian victory at Amberg, Nauendorf prevented General Jean-Victor Moreau's attempted Danube crossing at Neuburg and thwarted Moreau's next attempt to flank the Austrians by passing through Ulm.

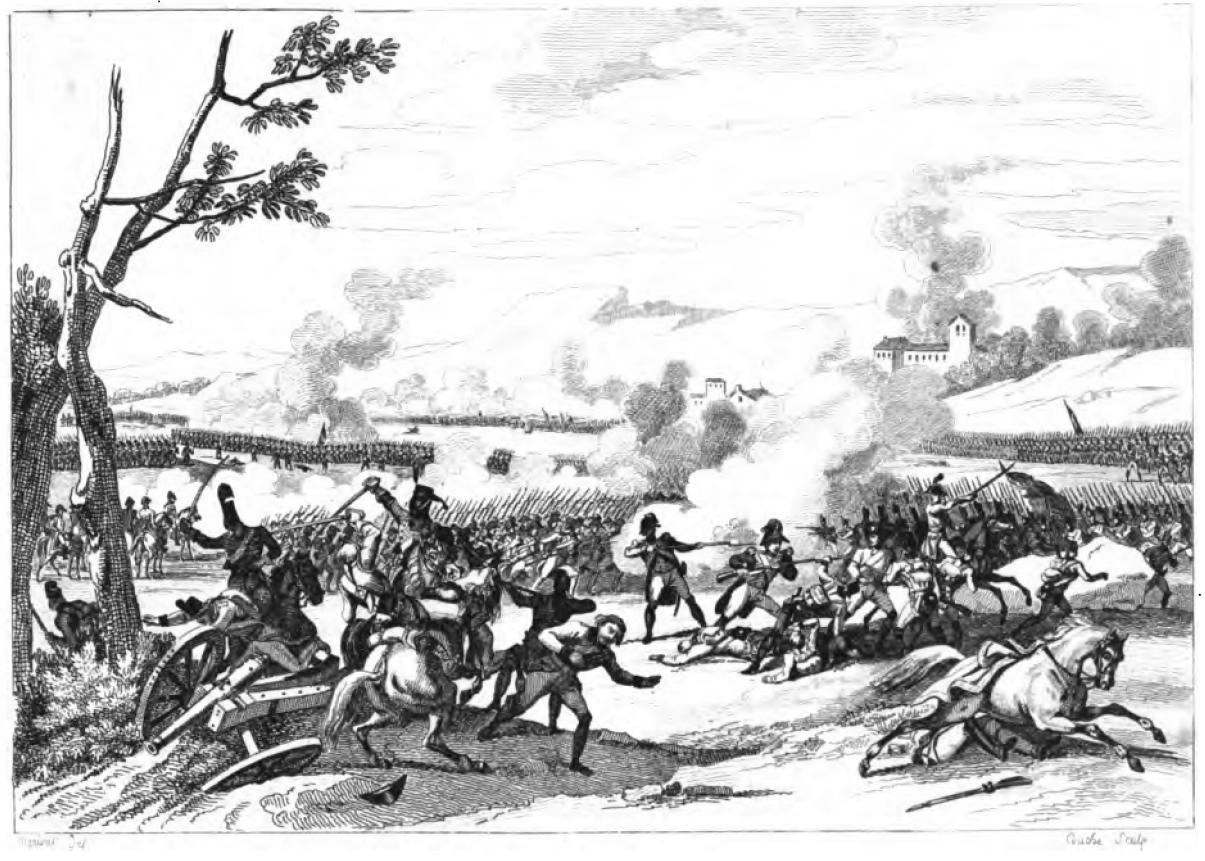
The second Battle of Messkirch in 1800 was a disaster for the Austrians.

=== Action in Switzerland and Swabia ===
When the War of the Second Coalition began in early 1799, Nauendorf fought in the Austrian victories at Ostrach (21 March) and then at Stockach (25 March). In early March he led the advanced guard of 17,000 across the Lech River by Augsburg, to deploy at Ostrach, a village about 9 kilometres (6 mi) of the Danube River and less than 2 kilometres (1 mi) from the Free Imperial City of Pfullendorf. Jourdan's Army of the Danube had crossed the Rhine on 1 March, and moved east to cut communication between the main Austrian force, quartered near Augsburg, and the Austrian troops in northern Italy. At Ostrach, his advanced guard sustained the immediate shock of contact, but the main force of the army was less than a day behind him, and Archduke Charles, the commander of the Austrian force, divided his army into three assault columns to make a simultaneous attack at three points on the French line; after a day of nasty fighting, the Austrians flanked the French at the north and south, and threatened to break through the line in the middle. The French withdrew to Mösskirch, and then to Engen and Stockach, where, on 25 March, the fighting renewed. At Stockach, Nauendorf again commanded the Austrian advanced guard, which was composed of troops seasoned, as he had been, in the Habsburg border wars. The advanced guard, or Vorhut, was redeployed before the battle as the center of the main Austrian line, and took the brunt of the initial fighting.

After the French retreat from the Hegau region into the Black Forest, Nauendorf took his force across the Rhine between Constance and Stein am Rhein on 22 May, and positioned himself at Steinegg. After Friedrich, Freiherr von Hotze's column successfully pushed the French out of Winterthur on 26 May, Archduke Charles instructed Nauendorf to secure the village of Neftenbach, which effectively closed a semicircle around the French force at Zürich. Once the Austrian main army united with its left wing, under Nauendorf, and its far left, under Hotze, Charles ordered the assault on Zürich. On 4 June, Nauendorf helped to rout the French force at Battle of Zürich, commanding the Coalition's right wing; with sustained pressure on Andre Massena's force, Massena pulled his army across the Limmat river, and dug into positions on the low ring of hills there, biding his time until the propitious moment to retake the city, which he did in September, 1799, at the Second Battle of Zürich; Nauendorf was not present for this action, being with Archduke Charles on a march north, toward Mainz. In 1800, Nauendorf fought in the Austrian losses at Stockach and Engen on 3 May, Mösskirch on 5 May, and Biberach on 9 May.

Nauendorf retired in poor health at the end of the 1800 campaign. He died in Troppau, Austrian Silesia (today Opava, in the Czech Republic), 30 December 1801.

== Sources ==
=== Bibliography ===
- Berenger, Jean. A History of the Habsburg Empire 1700–1918. C. Simpson, Trans. New York: Longman, 1997, ISBN 0-582-09007-5.
- (in German) "Nauendorf, Friedrich August Graf," in: Allgemeine Deutsche Biographie, herausgegeben von der Historischen Kommission bei der Bayerischen Akademie der Wissenschaften, Band 23 (1886), ab Seite 299, Digitale Volltext-Ausgabe in Wikisource Nauendorf. Accessed 15 October 2009.
- (in German) Dedekind, Franz. Geschichte des k.k. Kaiser Franz Joseph I. Dragoner-Regimentes Nr. 11, von seiner Errichtung, 20. Dezember 1688, bis 6. Mai 1879. Wien: np, 1879.
- (in German) Ebert, Jens-Florian. "Nauendorf, Friedrich August Graf," Die Österreichischen Generäle 1792–1815. Accessed 15 October 2009.
- Graham, Thomas. The History of the campaigns in the years 1796, 1797, 1798 and 1799, in Germany, Italy, Switzerland, & c. Illustrated with sixteen maps and plans of the countries and fortresses. London: T. Gardiner [etc.], 1812.
- Hochedlinger, Michael. Austria's Wars of Emergence, 1683–1799. London: Longman, 2003.
- Kudrna, Leopold, and Digby Smith. A biographical dictionary of all Austrian Generals in the French Revolutionary and Napoleonic Wars, 1792–1815. "Nauendorf". Napoleon Series, Robert Burnham, editor in chief. April 2008 version. Accessed 19 October 2009.
- (in German) K.u.K. Kriegsministerium. Militär-Schematismus des österreichischen Kaiserthums. Wien: Aus der k.k. Hof- und Staats-Druckerei. 1865 1918. p. 402, p. 807.
- Liddell-Hart, B. H. Strategy. NY: Praeger Publishers, 1967.
- de Ligne, Charles Joseph, Prince. The Prince de Ligne. His memoirs, letters, and miscellaneous papers. Boston: Hardy, Pratt & Co., 1902.
- (in German) Maria Theresa, Empress, and Joseph, Holy Roman Emperor. Maria Theresia und Joseph II. Ihre Correspondenz sammt Briefen Joseph's an seinen Bruder Leopold. Wien, C. Gerold's Sohn, 1867–68,
- McCulloch, J.R. "Gladova." A dictionary, geographical, statistical, and historical of the various countries, places, and principal natural objects in the world, London: Longman, Brown, Green, and Longmans, 1854.
- Nagy, Istvan. Hussar Regiment Number 8 (Austrian). Napoleon Series. Robert Burnham, editor in Chief. April 2008. Retrieved 18 March 2010.
- Rothenberg, Gunther E. Napoleon's Great Adversaries: Archduke Charles and the Austrian Army 1792–1914. Stroud, (Gloucester): Spellmount, 2007.
- (in German) Thürheim, Andreas Graf. Gedenkblätter aus der Kriegsgeschichte der k. k. oesterreichischen. Wien: K. Prochaska, 1880.
- (in German) Vaníček, Fr. Specialgeschichte der Militärgrenze : aus Originalquellen und Quellenwerken geschöpft. Wien: Aus der Kaiserlich-Königlichen Hof- und Staatsdruckerei, 1875.
- Williams, Henry Smith. The historians' history of the world: a comprehensive narrative of the rise and development of nations as recorded by the great writers of all ages. London: The Times, 1908.
- (in German) Wurzbach, Constant von. "Nauendorf." Biographisches lexikon des kaiserthums Oesterreich, enthaltend die lebensskizzen der denkwürdigen personen, welche seit 1750 in den österreichischen kronländern geboren wurden oder darin gelebt und gewirkt haben. Wien: K.K. Hof- und staatsdruckerie [etc.] 1856–91.

Military offices
Preceded by Dagobert Sigmund von Wurmser	Proprietor (Inhaber) of Hussar Regiment N°8 (1798-1801); Hussar Regiment N° 30 (1797); 1797–1801	Succeeded by Michael von Kienmayer
