= Pierre Chompré =

Pierre Chompré (Narcy, Haute-Marne 1698 – Paris, 18 August 1760), was a French schoolmaster, the author of educational books, and an editor of Latin sermons.

== Biography ==
In Paris, he directed and taught at a boarding school, and he wrote several educational books for the use of his pupils and other young people. His Dictionnaire abrégé de la Fable, published in 1727, was translated into many languages and reprinted many times until the middle of the nineteenth century. "Here we have a man named Chompré," wrote his contemporary Baron Grimm, "who possesses a very rare and recognized talent for the instruction of youth. He saw that the most perfect books we have from antiquity repelled young people through their uselessness, obscurity, or inappropriately high academic level. He is responsible for carefully extracting all that can attract, entertain or educate young people."

His brother, Étienne Marie Chompré, was also a schoolmaster. His son was Nicolas Maurice Chompré.

== Main publications ==
- Dictionnaire abrégé de la fable, pour l'intelligence des poètes, et la connaissance des tableaux et des statues, dont les sujets sont tirés de la fable (1727) Text online
- Selecta latini sermonis exemplaria e scriptoribus probatissimis ad christianae juventutis usum collecta (3 volumes, 1749–1753)
- Vocabulaire Latin-François contenant les mots de la latinité des différens siècles ... avec un vocabulaire François-Latin (1754)
- Introduction à la langue latine par la voie de la traduction (1751)
- Dictionnaire abrégé de la Bible pour la connaissance des tableaux historiques tirés de la Bible même et de Josephus (1755)
- Moyens sûrs d'apprendre facilement les langues et principalement la latine (1757)
- Introduction à l'étude de la langue grecque, ou Feuilles élémentaires (1758)
- Traduction des extraits des comédies de Plante et de Térence, contenu dans Cours d'études à l'usage des élèves de l'École royale militaire by Charles Batteux (1778)

== Sources ==
- Sources biographiques : Pierre Larousse, Grand Dictionnaire universel du XIXe siècle, vol. IV, 1869.
