= Champagne, Eure-et-Loir =

Champagne
- Part of Goussainville
- Location of Champagne
- Location within France Location within Centre-Val de Loire
- Coordinates: 48°45′48″N 1°34′11″E
- Country: France
- Region: Centre-Val de Loire
- Department: Eure-et-Loir
- Arrondissement: Dreux
- Canton: Anet
- Commune: Goussainville
- Area^{1}: 2.21 km^{2} (0.85 sq mi)
- Elevation: 134 m (440 ft)
- Highest elevation: 136 m (446 ft)
- Lowest elevation: 121 m (397 ft)
- Population (2017): 328
  - Density: 148/km^{2} (384/sq mi)
- Time zone: UTC+01:00 (CET)
  - Summer (DST): UTC+02:00 (CEST)
- Postal code: 28410
- ^{1} French Land Register data, which excludes lakes, ponds, glaciers > 1 km^{2} (0.386 sq mi or 247 acres) and river estuaries.

Champagne (French pronunciation: [ʃɑ̃paɲ]) is a former commune in the Eure-et-Loir department in northern France. Since January 2015, it is part of the commune Goussainville.

== See also ==
- Communes of the Eure-et-Loir department
