= Obenheim =

Obenheim Owene
- Commune
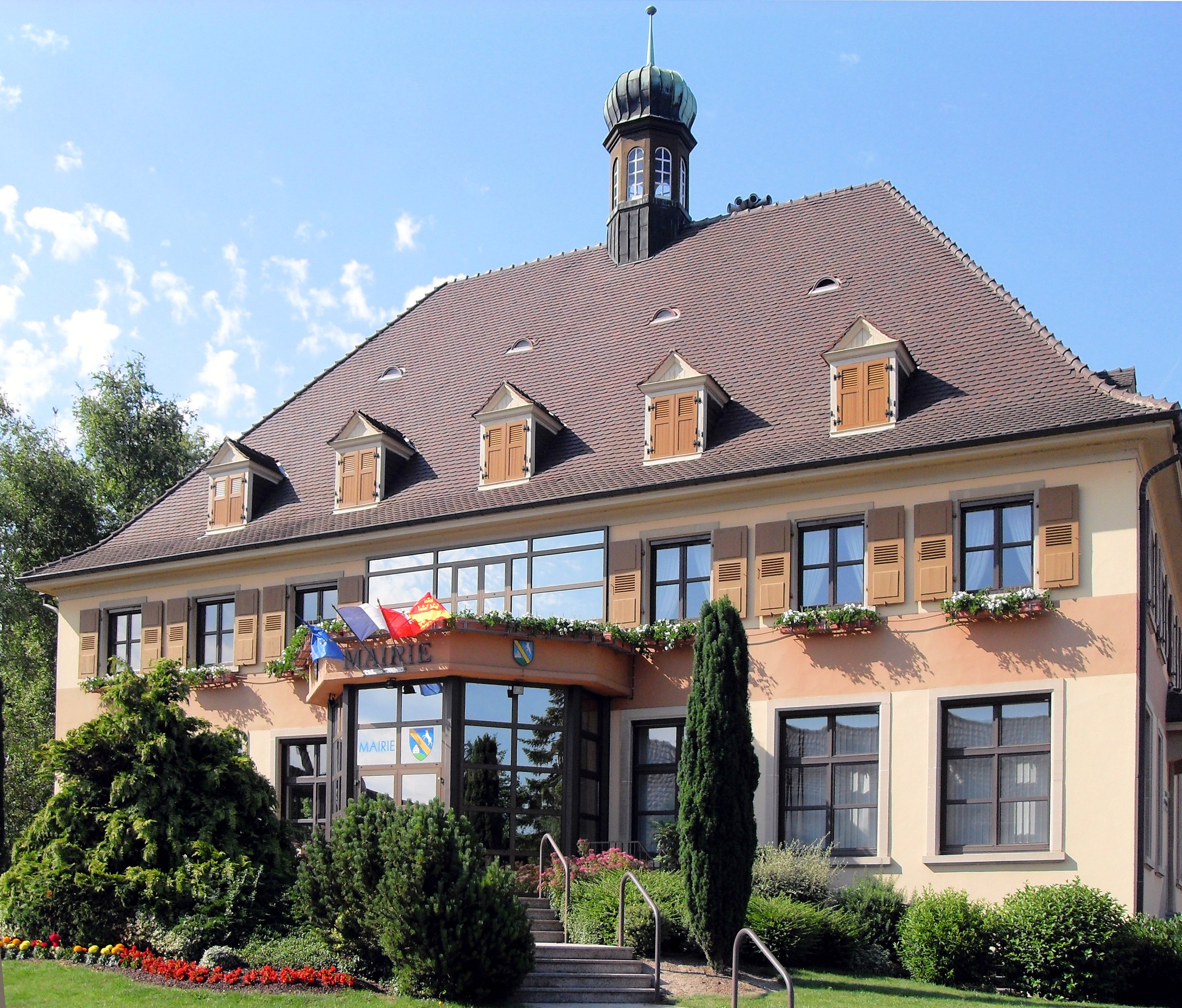
- The town hall in Obenheim

- Coat of arms
- Location of Obenheim
- Location within France Location within Grand Est
- Coordinates: 48°21′39″N 7°41′24″E
- Country: France
- Region: Grand Est
- Department: Bas-Rhin
- Arrondissement: Sélestat-Erstein
- Canton: Erstein
- Intercommunality: Canton d'Erstein

Government
  - Mayor (2020–2026): Rémy Schenk
- Area^{1}: 7.99 km^{2} (3.08 sq mi)
- Highest elevation: 159 m (522 ft)
- Lowest elevation: 154 m (505 ft)
- Population (2023): 1,403
  - Density: 176/km^{2} (455/sq mi)
- Time zone: UTC+01:00 (CET)
  - Summer (DST): UTC+02:00 (CEST)
- INSEE/Postal code: 67338 /67230
- ^{1} French Land Register data, which excludes lakes, ponds, glaciers > 1 km^{2} (0.386 sq mi or 247 acres) and river estuaries.

Obenheim (French pronunciation: [obənaim]) is a commune in the Bas-Rhin department in Alsace in north-eastern France.

== Population ==
Historical population
Year	Pop.	±% p.a.
1968	1,042	—
1975	1,127	+1.13%
1982	1,130	+0.04%
1990	1,078	−0.59%
1999	1,214	+1.33%
2007	1,371	+1.53%
2012	1,402	+0.45%
2017	1,359	−0.62%
2023	1,403	+0.53%
Source: INSEE

== See also ==
- Communes of the Bas-Rhin department
