= Grison Alps =

Mountains in Graubünden, Switzerland

Coordinates: 46°N 9°E

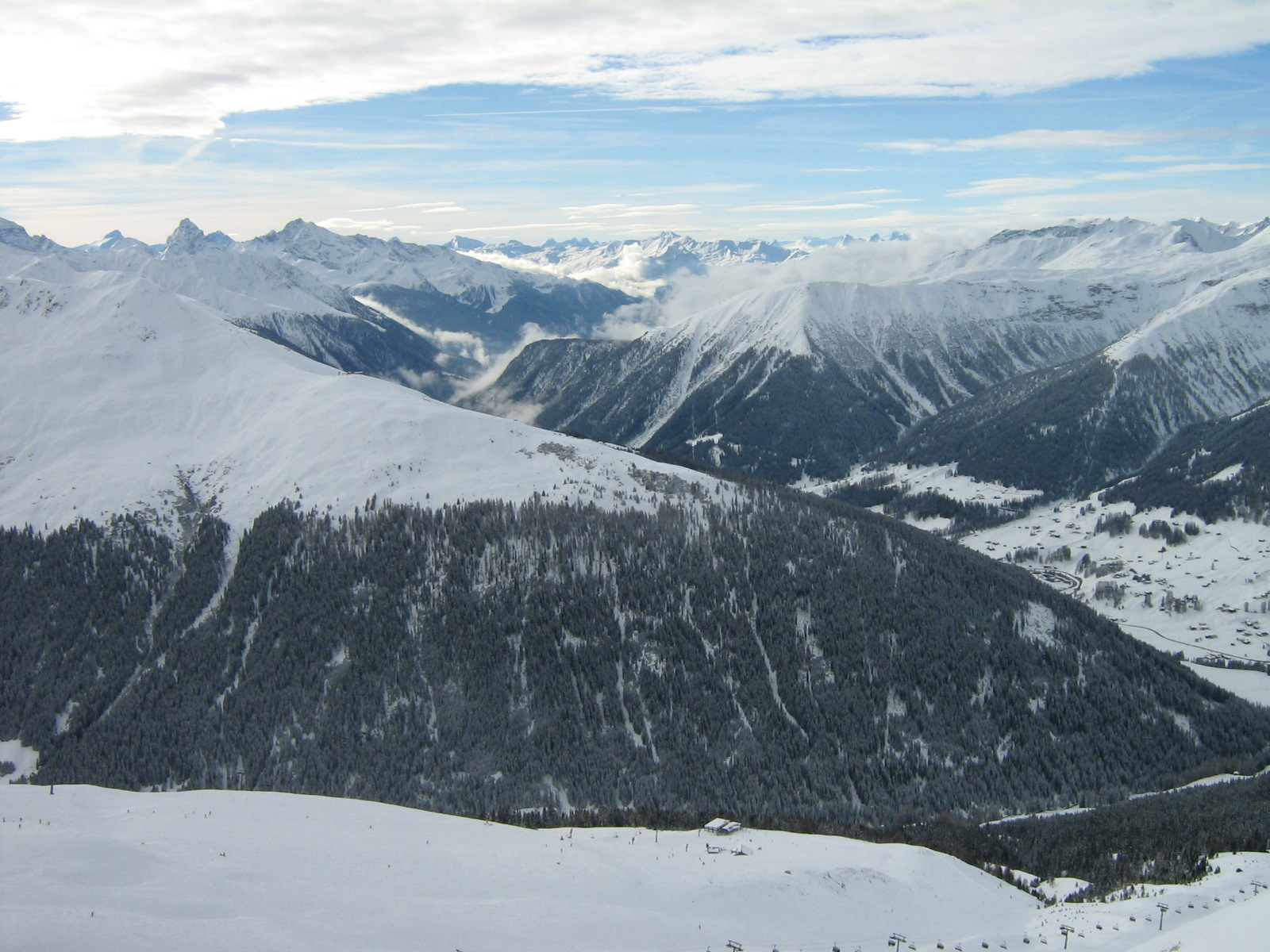
The Grison Alps seen from Jakobshorn

The Grison Alps are the mountains of the Graubünden canton of Switzerland (Grisons being the English name for the Graubünden region). There are many significant peaks in the Grison Alps, including the Tödi (3,614 m) and the highest peak, Piz Bernina (4,049 m). Many of the mountain ranges feature extensive glaciers, such as at the Adula, the Albula, the Silvretta, the Bernnina or the Rätikon range. The Grison Alps include parts of both the Eastern Alps and the Western Alps. The Eastern Alps located in Graubünden are the Rhaetian Alps, which is part to the Central Eastern Alps.

The Rhaetian Alps consists of the following mountain ranges: Samnaun Alps, Rätikon, Silvretta, Sesvenna Range, Albula Range, Plessur Range, Oberhalbstein Range, Livigno Range, Bregaglia Range and the Bernina Range. The Western Alps located in Graubünden, include portions of the Lepontine Alps and the Glarus Alps.
