= Battle of Messkirch order of battle =

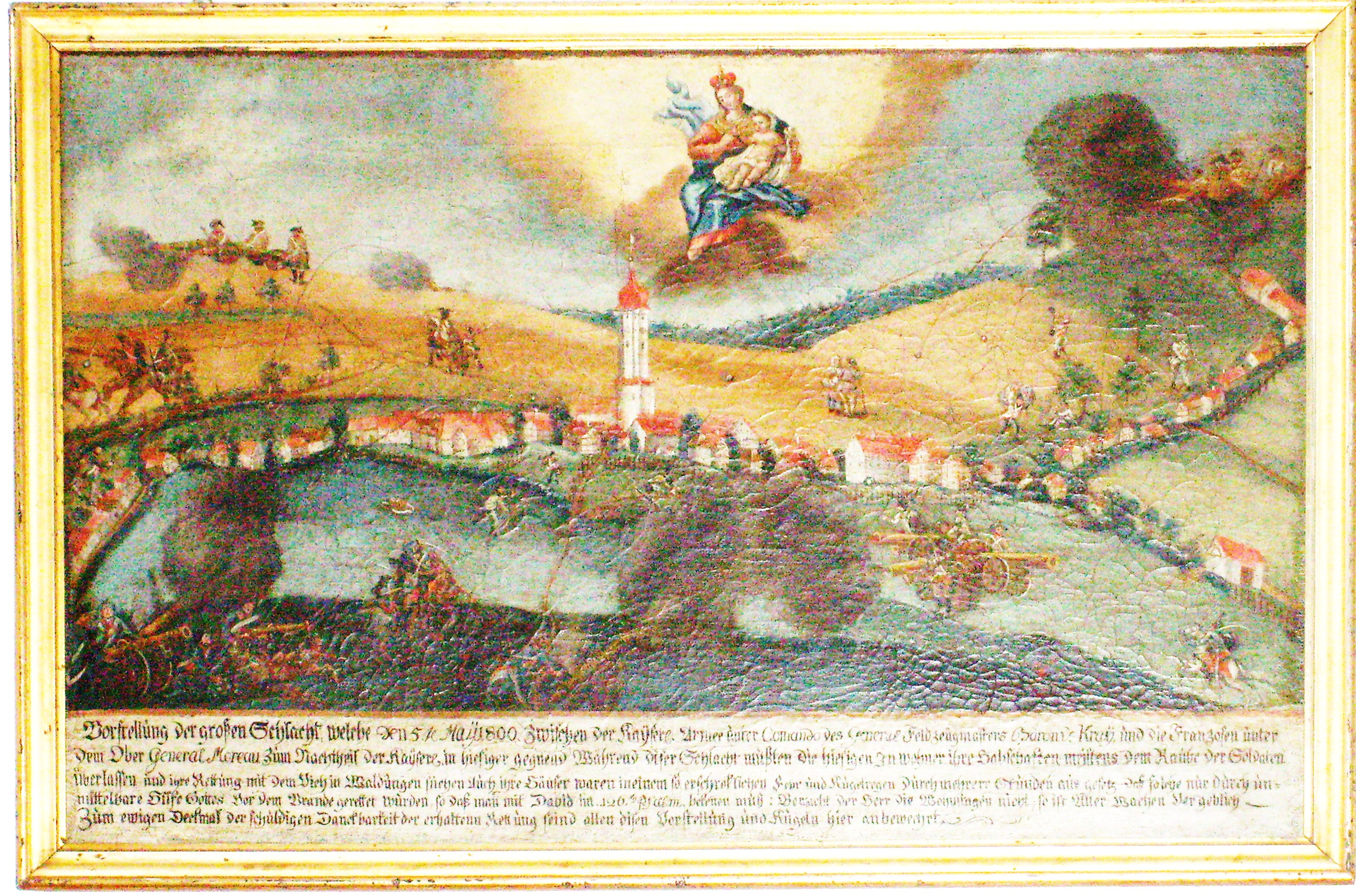
Votive icon of the Battle of Messkirch

The Battle of Messkirch on 5 May 1800 was the major engagement in the War of the Second Coalition. It followed the Battle of Stockach on 3 May. The campaign began on 25 April when a French force emerged from the Kehl bridgehead. This marked the start of the offensive of Jean Victor Marie Moreau's Army of the Rhine against Paul Kray's army of Habsburg Austria and its Bavarian, Württemberg and other German allies.

== French Army ==
=== Headquarters ===
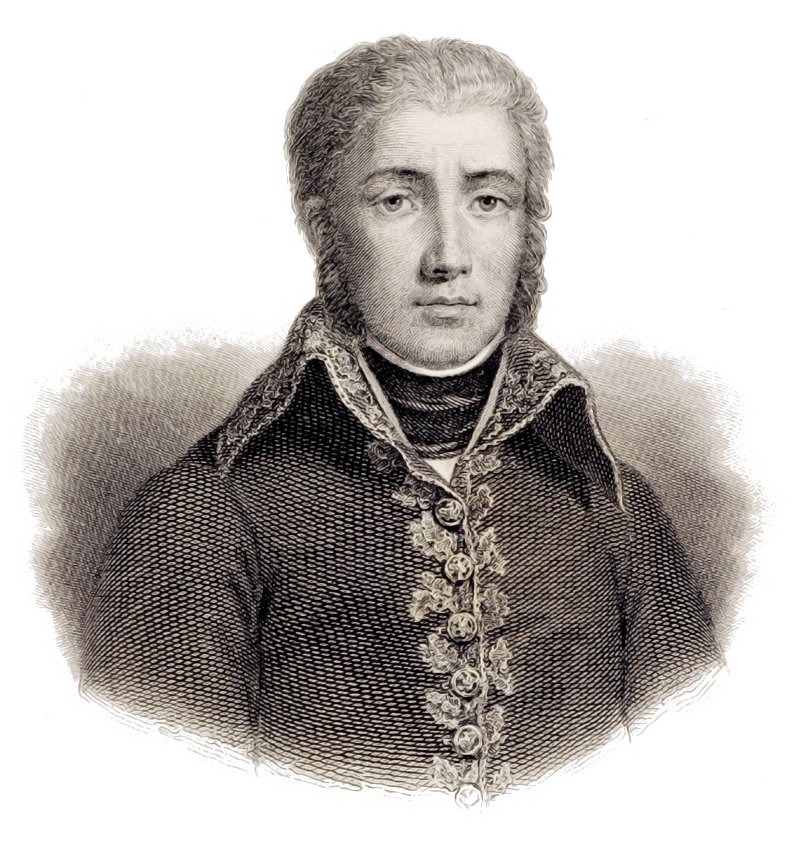
Jean Victor Moreau

Commanding General: General-in-Chief Jean Victor Marie Moreau

- Chief of Staff: General of Division Jean-Joseph, Marquis Dessolles
- Chief of Artillery: General of Division Jean-Baptiste Eblé
- Inspector of Infantry: General of Division Balthazar Alexis Henri Schauenburg
- Inspector of Cavalry: General of Division François Antoine Louis Bourcier
- Chief Engineer: General of Brigade Louis Clemencet

Source: Nafziger, George. "French Army in Germany, 10 May 1800" (PDF). US Army Combined Arms Center.

=== Right Wing ===
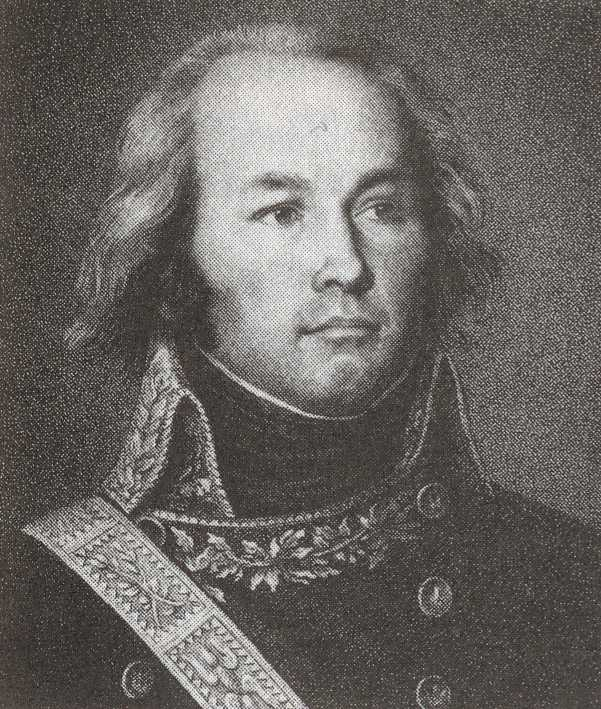
Claude Lecourbe

General of Division Claude Lecourbe in Zürich

- General of Division: Dominique Vandamme (9,632 infantry, 540 cavalry)
  - Generals of Brigade: Henri-Antoine Jardon, Anne Gilbert de Laval, Gabriel Jean Joseph Molitor
    - 1st Light Infantry Demi Brigade
    - 36th Line Infantry Demi Brigade
    - 83rd Line Infantry Demi Brigade
    - 94th Line Infantry Demi Brigade
    - 8th Hussar Regiment
- General of Division: Jean Thomas Guillaume Lorge (8,238 infantry, 464 cavalry)
  - Generals of Brigade: François Goullus, François Bontemps
    - 10th Light Infantry Demi Brigade
    - 37th Line Infantry Demi Brigade
    - 84th Line Infantry Demi Brigade
    - 109th Line Infantry Demi Brigade
    - 9th Hussar Regiment
- General of Division: Joseph Hélie Désiré Perruquet de Montrichard (8,238 infantry, 464 cavalry)
  - Generals of Brigade: Joseph Augustin Fournier d'Aultane
    - 10th Light Infantry Demi Brigade
    - 38th Line Infantry Demi Brigade
    - 67th Line Infantry Demi Brigade
- General of Division Etienne Marie Antoine Champion de Nansouty (1,500 infantry, 1,280 cavalry)
  - Unbrigaded:
    - Combined Grenadiers
    - 25th Cavalry Regiment
    - 11th Dragoon Regiment
    - 12th Chasseurs a Cheval Regiment

Source: Smith, Digby (1998). The Napoleonic Wars Data Book. London: Greenhill. p. 177. ISBN 1-85367-276-9.

=== Center ===
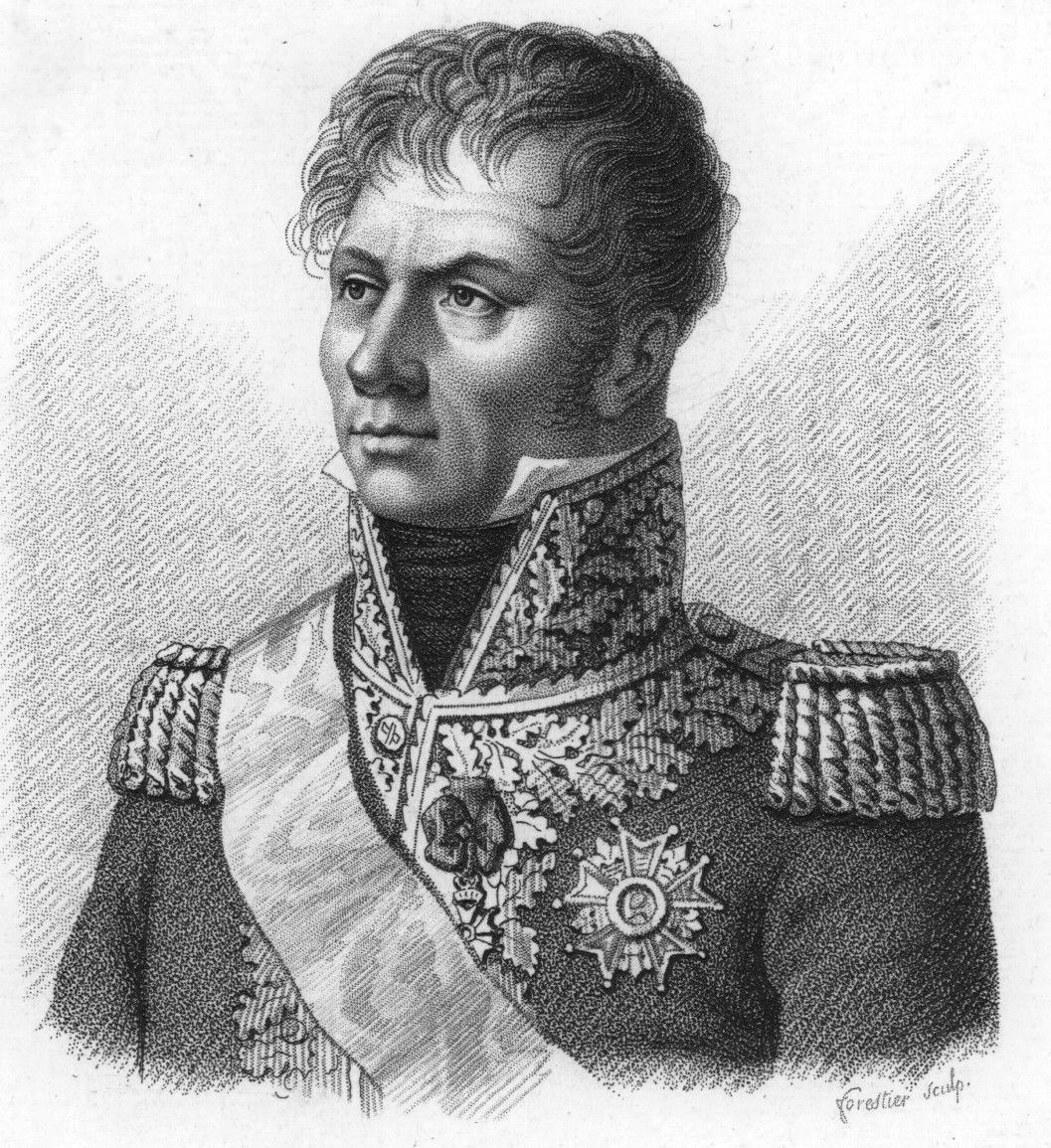
Laurent Saint-Cyr

General of Division Laurent Gouvion Saint-Cyr in Basel

- General of Division Louis Baraguey d'Hilliers (8,340 infantry, 542 cavalry)
  - Generals of Brigade: Dominique Joba, François-Xavier Roussel, Just-Pasteur Sabathier
    - 12th Light Infantry Demi Brigade
    - 1st Line Infantry Demi Brigade
    - 15th Line Infantry Demi Brigade
    - 23rd Line Infantry Demi Brigade
    - 2nd Hussar Regiment
- General of Division: Jean Victor Tharreau (8,326 infantry, 611 cavalry)
  - Generals of Brigade: Etienne Heudelet de Bierre, René-François-Jean Aubrée, Charles Victor Woirgard
    - 2nd Light Infantry Demi Brigade
    - 24th Line Infantry Demi Brigade
    - 51st Line Infantry Demi Brigade
    - 101st Line Infantry Demi Brigade
    - 23rd Dragoon Regiment
    - 16th Chasseurs a Cheval Regiment
- General of Division: Michel Ney (7,270 infantry, 569 cavalry)
  - Generals of Brigade: Jean Pierre François Bonet, Charles August Bonnamy
    - 12th Light Infantry Demi Brigade
    - 54th Line Infantry Demi Brigade
    - 76th Line Infantry Demi Brigade
    - 103rd Line Infantry Demi Brigade
    - 8th Chasseurs a Cheval Regiment
- General of Brigade Nicolas Ernault des Bruslys (2,474 infantry, 1,616 cavalry)
  - Generals of Brigade: Louis Michel Antoine Sahuc, Charles Saligny, Jean Louis Debilly
    - 16th Line Infantry Demi Brigade
    - 12th Cavalry Regiment
    - 17th Cavalry Regiment
    - 2nd Dragoon Regiment
    - 5th Chasseurs a Cheval Regiment

Source: Smith, Digby (1998). The Napoleonic Wars Data Book. London: Greenhill. p. 178. ISBN 1-85367-276-9.

=== Left Wing ===
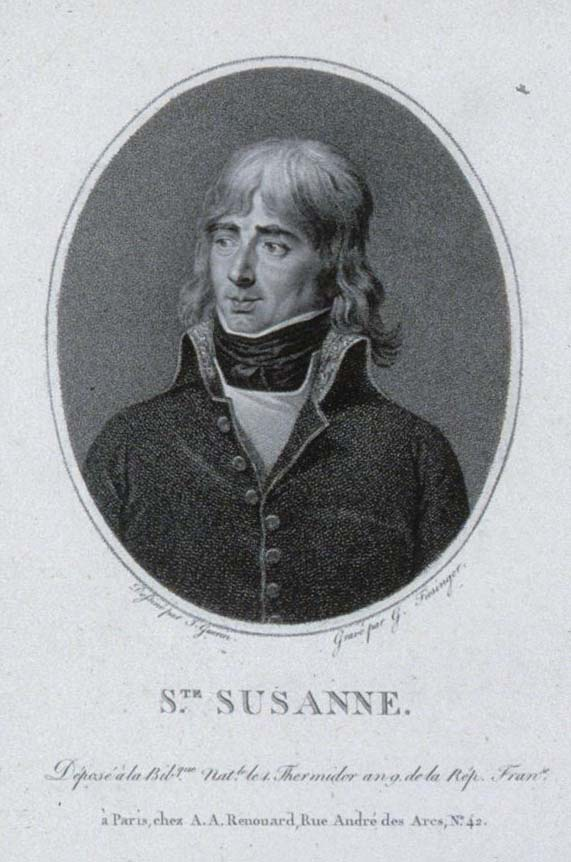
Gilles Sainte-Suzanne

General of Division Gilles Joseph Martin Bruneteau de Sainte-Suzanne in Strasbourg

- General of Division Claude-Sylvestre Colaud (2,740 infantry, 981 cavalry)
  - Generals of Brigade: Jean-Laurent-Justine Lacoste, Jean Pierre Girard-Vieux
    - 48th Line Infantry Demi Brigade
    - 10th Cavalry Regiment
    - 16th Cavalry Regiment
    - 20th Chasseurs a Cheval Regiment
- General of Division: Joseph Souham (4,687 infantry, 1,394 cavalry)
  - Generals of Brigade: Charles Mathieu Isidore Decaen, Jacques-Pierre-Louis Puthod
    - 8th Line Infantry Demi Brigade
    - 95th Line Infantry Demi Brigade
    - 7th Cavalry Regiment
    - 6th Dragoon Regiment
    - 1st Chasseurs a Cheval Regiment
- General of Division: Claude Juste Alexandre Legrand (5,286 infantry, 1,094 cavalry)
  - Generals of Brigade: Jacques Denis Boivin, Jean-Baptiste Drouet
    - 7th Line Infantry Demi Brigade
    - 27th Line Infantry Demi Brigade
    - 13th Dragoon Regiment
    - 6th Chasseurs a Cheval Regiment
- General of Division Henri François Delaborde (2,573 infantry, 286 cavalry)
  - Generals of Brigade: Jean-Pierre-Portschy Mercier, Henri-Joseph Thüring de Ryss
    - 29th Line Infantry Demi Brigade
    - 65th Line Infantry Demi Brigade
    - 2nd Helvétique Légion
    - 4th Cavalry Regiment
    - 19th Cavalry Regiment

Source: Smith, Digby (1998). The Napoleonic Wars Data Book. London: Greenhill. p. 178. ISBN 1-85367-276-9.

=== Reserve ===
General-in-Chief Moreau

- General of Division Antoine Guillaume Delmas (8,635 infantry, 1,031 cavalry)
  - Generals of Brigade: Jean-Baptiste Jacopin, Charles Louis Dieudonne Grandjean, Jean Baptiste Lorcet, Jacques Quétard, Boyer
    - 14th Light Infantry Demi Brigade
    - 46th Line Infantry Demi Brigade
    - 50th Line Infantry Demi Brigade
    - 57th Line Infantry Demi Brigade
    - 108th Line Infantry Demi Brigade
    - 6th Cavalry Regiment
    - 4th Hussar Regiment
    - 11th Chasseurs a Cheval Regiment
- General of Division Charles Leclerc (6,035 infantry, 963 cavalry)
  - Generals of Brigade: Louis Bastoul, Frédéric Henri Walther, Adrien Marie Gabriel Desperrières
    - 14th Light Infantry Demi Brigade
    - 53rd Line Infantry Demi Brigade
    - 89th Line Infantry Demi Brigade
    - 10th Chasseurs a Cheval Regiment
    - 23rd Chasseurs a Cheval Regiment
- General of Division Antoine Richepanse (6,848 infantry, 1,187 cavalry)
  - Generals of Brigade: Antoine Digonet, Pierre François Joseph Durutte
    - Combined Grenadiers
    - 4th Line Infantry Demi Brigade
    - 50th Line Infantry Demi Brigade
    - 100th Line Infantry Demi Brigade
    - 13th Cavalry Regiment
    - 17th Dragoon Regiment
    - 5th Hussar Regiment
- General of Division Jean-Joseph Ange d'Hautpoul (1,504 cavalry)
  - General of Brigade: Jean-Louis-Brigitte Espagne
    - 1st Carabinier Regiment
    - 2nd Carabinier Regiment
  - General of Brigade: Denis Felix Devrigny
    - 8th Cavalry Regiment
    - 9th Cavalry Regiment

Source: Smith, Digby (1998). The Napoleonic Wars Data Book. London: Greenhill. p. 178. ISBN 1-85367-276-9.

=== Detached ===
- General of Division Louis-Antoine Choin de Montchoisy (7,715 infantry, 519 cavalry) in Switzerland
  - Generals of Brigade: Joseph Antoine Mainoni, Théodore Chabert
    - 1st Light Infantry Demi Brigade
    - 9th Line Infantry Demi Brigade
    - 28th Line Infantry Demi Brigade
    - 44th Line Infantry Demi Brigade
    - 102nd Line Infantry Demi Brigade
    - 14th Cavalry Regiment
    - 22nd Cavalry Regiment
- General of Division Jean François Leval (5,640 infantry, 426 cavalry)
  - Unbrigaded:
    - 65th Line Infantry Demi Brigade
    - 91st Line Infantry Demi Brigade
    - 110th Line Infantry Demi Brigade
    - 1st Helvétique Légion
    - 3rd Hussar Regiment
- General of Division François Xavier Jacob Freytag (2,935 infantry)
  - Unbrigaded:
    - 29th Line Infantry Demi Brigade
    - 95th Line Infantry Demi Brigade
    - 3rd Helvétique Légion
- General of Division Joseph Gilot (750 cavalry)
  - Unbrigaded:
    - 1st Dragoon Regiment
    - 6th Hussar Regiment
- General of Division Alexandre Paul Guérin de Chateaunef-Randon (3,430 infantry, 485 cavalry)
  - Unbrigaded:
    - 80th Line Infantry Demi Brigade
    - Polish Danube Legion
    - 15th Cavalry Regiment
    - 24th Cavalry Regiment
- General of Division Antoine Laroche Dubouscat (3,100 infantry, 91 cavalry)
  - Unbrigaded:
    - 20th Line Infantry Demi Brigade
    - North French Legion
    - 16th Cavalry Regiment

Source: Smith, Digby (1998). The Napoleonic Wars Data Book. London: Greenhill. p. 178. ISBN 1-85367-276-9.

== See also ==
The following are excellent sources for the full names and ranks of French and Austrian generals of the French Revolution and Napoleonic periods.

- Broughton, Tony (2006). "Generals Who Served in the French Army during the Period 1789-1815". The Napoleon Series.
- Smith, Digby; Kudrna, Leopold. "Biographical Dictionary of all Austrian Generals during the French Revolutionary and Napoleonic Wars, 1792-1815". napoleon-series.org.
