= Campaigns of 1800 of the French Revolutionary Wars =

The French Revolutionary Wars continued from 1799 with the French fighting the forces of the Second Coalition. Napoleon Bonaparte had returned from Egypt and taken control of the French government, marking the end of the French Revolution. He prepared a new campaign, sending Moreau to the Rhine frontier and personally going to take command in the Alps, where French forces had been driven almost out of Italy in 1799.

At the start of the campaigning season of 1800, the Austrians had strong armies north and south of the Alps

- about 120,000 men in the Black Forest under Pál Kray (defending the direct (Rhine–Danube) route from France to Vienna
- about 100,000 men in northern Italy under Michael von Melas defending the Austrian possessions in northern Italy, and the Po Valley, which Napoleon had used as a backdoor to Vienna in his previous Italian campaigns

The French had

- about 120,000 men under Moreau facing Kray
- about 40,000 men under André Masséna holding Genoa and preventing invasion of Southern France from Italy
- about 50,000 men under Berthier forming the Army of the Reserve and centred on Dijon

Both the Austrians and the French decided to make their main effort in Italy. (Bonaparte would have preferred the main attack to be on Kray by a flanking move through Northern Switzerland, but the working relationship with Moreau was poor).

== Italy ==
Melas attacked first, and by the third week in April had advanced to the Var, with Massena and half his army in Genoa besieged by land by the Austrians and under tight blockade by the Royal Navy. In response Berthier moved – not to the threatened frontier, but to Geneva – and Massena was instructed to hold Genoa until 4 June.

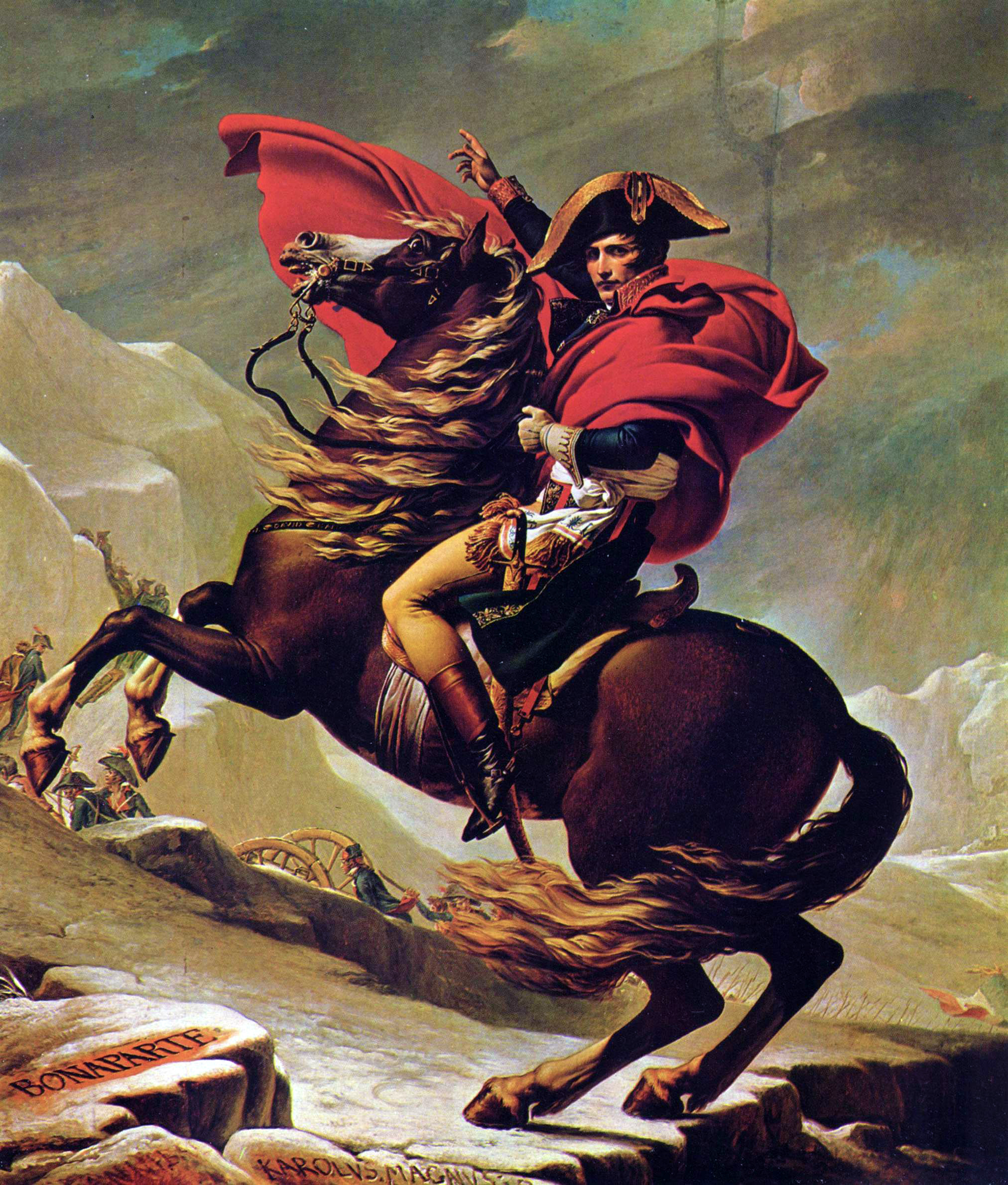
Jacques-Louis David: Napoleon crosses the Great St. Bernard Pass. In reality, Napoleon crossed the Alps on the back of a mule.

The Army of the Reserve was joined by Napoleon, and in mid-May set out to cross the Alps to attack the Austrian rear. The bulk of the army crossed by the Great St Bernard Pass still covered by snow. Artillery was manhandled over with great effort and ingenuity. On 14 May 1800, the 40,000-strong French army was stopped by 400 Austro-Piedmontese soldiers at Fort Bard in the Aosta Valley. They held the pass for two weeks, completely ruining Napoleon's surprise attack on the Po Valley.

Once over the Alps, Napoleon did not proceed directly to the relief of Genoa. Instead, he advanced on Milan, to improve his lines of communication (via the Simplon and St Gotthard passes) and to threaten Melas's lines of communication with Mantua and Vienna, in the belief that this would cause Melas to raise the siege of Genoa. He entered Milan on 2 June and by crossing to the South bank of the Po completely cut Melas's communications. Taking up a strong defensive position at Stradella, he confidently awaited an attempt by the Austrian Army to fight its way out.

However, Melas had not raised the siege of Genoa, and on 4 June the French Army marched out with all equipment towards France as per the terms of the negotiated evacuation of the city. Napoleon then faced the possibility that, thanks to the British command of the Mediterranean, far from falling back, the Austrians could instead take Genoa as their new base and be supplied by sea. His defensive posture would not prevent this; he had to find and attack the Austrians before they could regroup. He therefore advanced from Stradella towards Alessandria, where Melas was, apparently doing nothing. Convinced that Melas was about to retreat, Napoleon sent strong detachments to block Melas's routes northwards to the Po, and southwards to Genoa. At this point, Melas attacked, and for all the brilliance of the previous campaign, Napoleon found himself at a significant disadvantage in the consequent Battle of Marengo (14 June). Napoleon was effectively defeated in a tough battle in the morning and early afternoon; Melas, thinking he had already won, had turned over delivery of the coup de grace to a subordinate, when the prompt return of a detached French force under Desaix and a vigorous French counter-attack (in the course of which Desaix was killed) converted the battle into an important French victory.

Melas promptly entered into negotiations which led to the Austrians evacuating northern Italy west of the Ticino, and suspending military operations in Italy.

Napoleon returned to Paris after the victory, leaving Brune to consolidate in Italy and begin a march toward Austria.

== Germany ==
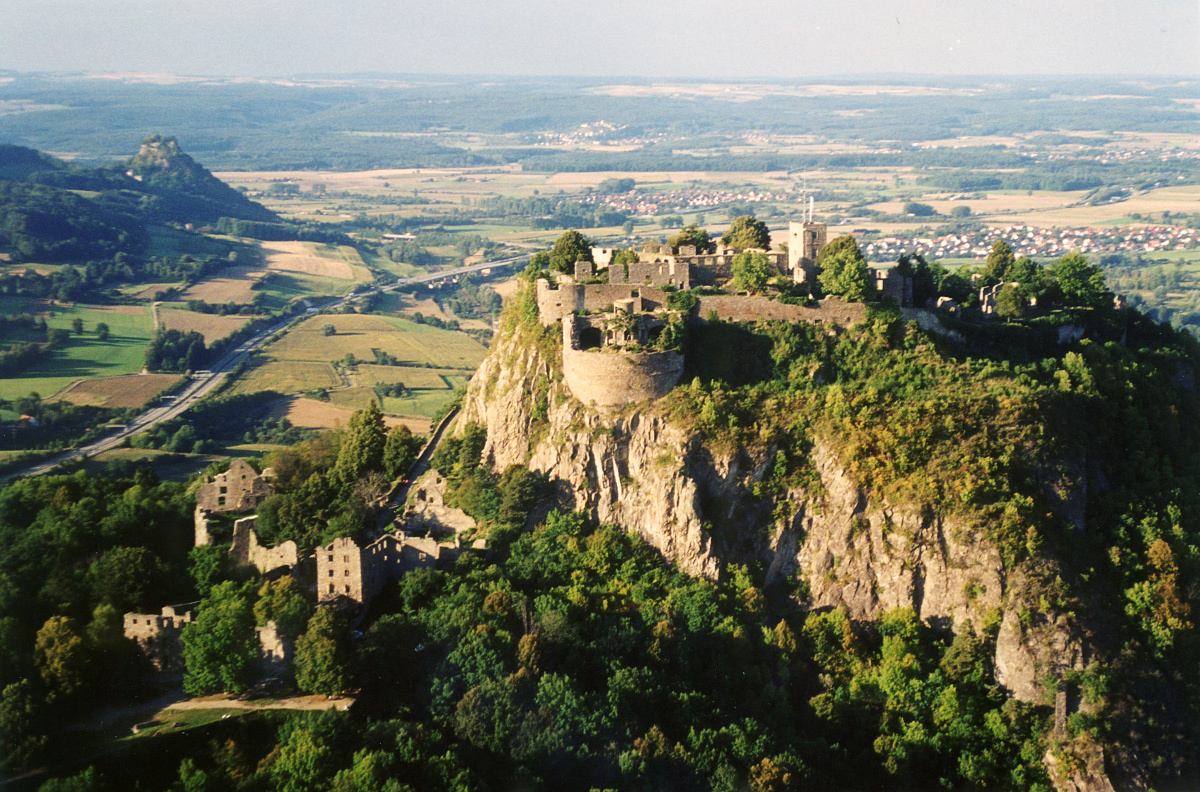
The Battles of Stockach and Engen in May 1800, followed by a larger battle at Meßkirch, followed the Hohentwiel capitulation to the French.

Although the First Coalition forces achieved several initial victories at Verdun, Kaiserslautern, Neerwinden, Mainz, Amberg and Würzburg, the efforts of Napoleon Bonaparte in northern Italy pushed Austrian forces back and resulted in the negotiation of the Peace of Leoben (17 April 1797) and the subsequent Treaty of Campo Formio (October 1797). This treaty proved difficult to implement. Austria was slow to give up some of the Venetian territories. A Congress convened at Rastatt for the purposes of deciding which southwestern German states would be mediatised to compensate the dynastic houses for territorial losses, but was unable to make any progress. Supported by French republican forces, Swiss insurgents staged several uprisings, ultimately causing the overthrow of the Swiss Confederation after 18 months of civil war. By early 1799, the French Directory had become impatient with stalling tactics employed by Austria. The uprising in Naples raised further alarms, and recent gains in Switzerland suggested the timing was fortuitous to venture on another campaign in northern Italy and southwestern Germany.

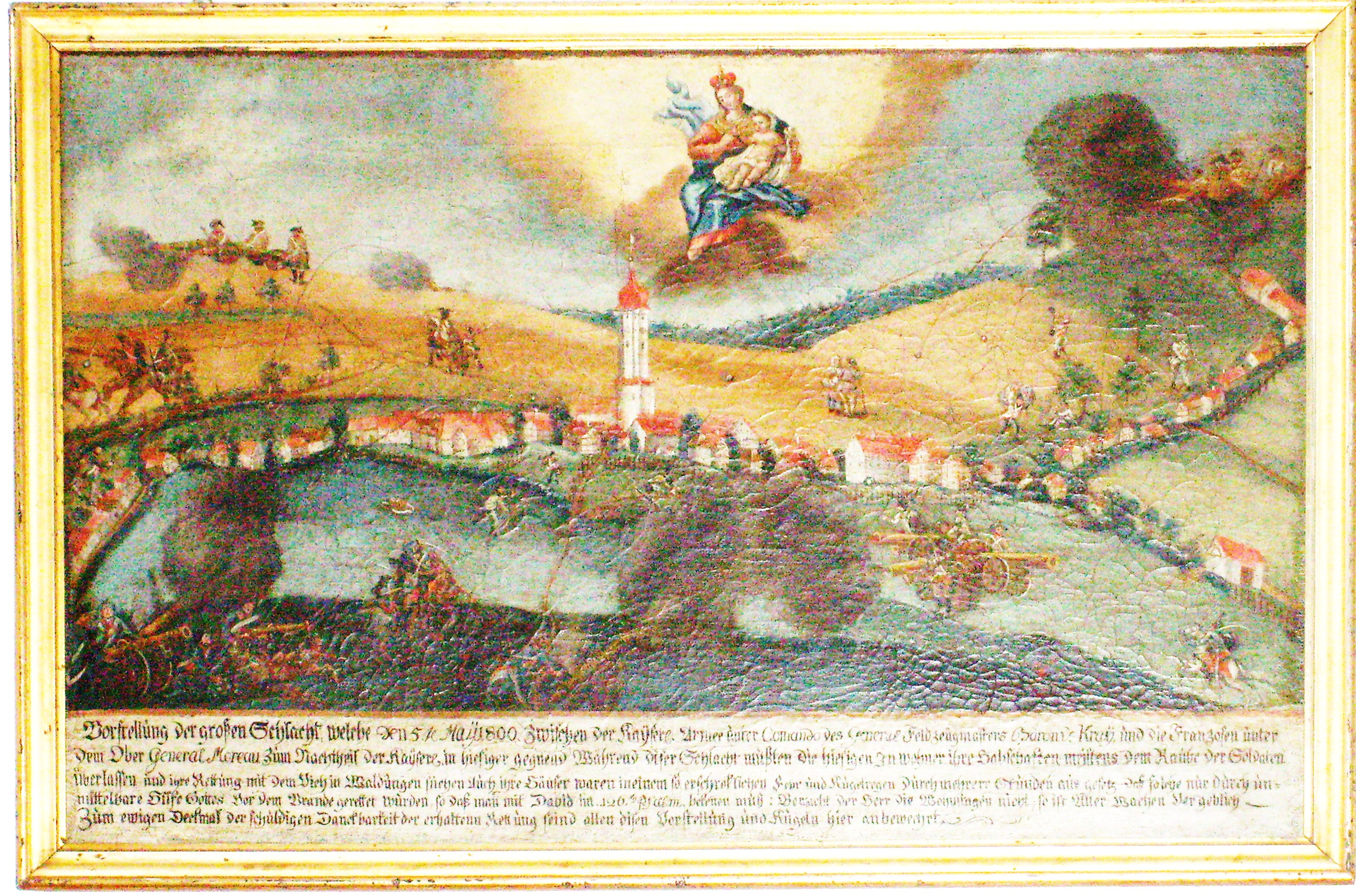
The Battle of Meßkirch was won from the high ground.

At the beginning of 1800, the armies of France and Austria faced each other across the Rhine. Feldzeugmeister Pál Kray led approximately 120,000 troops. In addition to his Austrian regulars, his force included 12,000 men from the Electorate of Bavaria, 6,000 troops from the Duchy of Württemberg, 5,000 soldiers of low quality from the Archbishopric of Mainz, and 7,000 militiamen from the County of Tyrol. Of these, 25,000 men were deployed east of Lake Constance (Bodensee) to protect the Vorarlberg. Kray posted his main body of 95,000 soldiers in the L-shaped angle where the Rhine changes direction from a westward flow along the northern border of Switzerland to a northward flow along the eastern border of France. Unwisely, Kray set up his main magazine at Stockach, near the northwestern end of Lake Constance, only a day's march from French-held Switzerland.

General of Division Jean Victor Marie Moreau commanded a modestly-equipped army of 137,000 French troops. Of these, 108,000 troops were available for field operations while the other 29,000 watched the Swiss border and held the Rhine fortresses. First Consul Napoleon Bonaparte offered a plan of operations based on outflanking the Austrians by a push from Switzerland, but Moreau declined to follow it. Rather, Moreau planned to cross the Rhine near Basel where the river swung to the north. A French column would distract Kray from Moreau's true intentions by crossing the Rhine from the west. Bonaparte wanted Claude Lecourbe's corps to be detached to Italy after the initial battles, but Moreau had other plans. Through a series of complicated maneuvers in which he flanked, double flanked, and reflanked Kray's army, Moreau's army lay on the eastern slope of the Black Forest, while portions of Kray's army was still guarded the passes on the other side. Battles at Engen and Stockach were fought on 3 May 1800 between the army of the French First Republic under Jean Victor Marie Moreau and the army of the Habsburg monarchy led by Pál Kray. The fighting near Engen resulted in a stalemate with heavy losses on both sides. However, while the two main armies were engaged at Engen, Claude Lecourbe captured Stockach from its Austrian defenders under Joseph Louis, Prince of Lorraine-Vaudémont. The loss of this main supply base at Stockach compelled Kray to order a retreat to Meßkirch, where they enjoyed a more favourable defensive position. It also meant, however, that any retreat by Kray into Austria via Switzerland and the Vorarlberg was cut off.

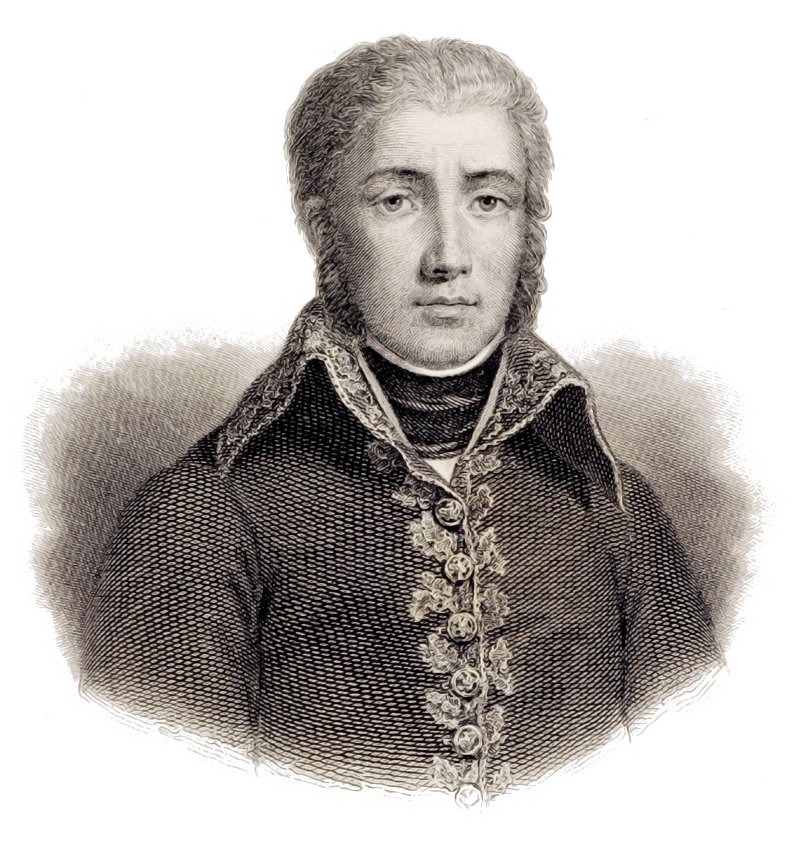
Jean Victor Moreau commanded the French Army of the Rhine.

On 4 and 5 May, the French launched repeated and fruitless assaults on the Meßkirch. At nearby Krumbach, where the Austrians also had the superiority of position and force, the 1st Demi-Brigade took the village and the heights around it, which gave them a commanding aspect over Meßkirch. Subsequently, Kray withdrew his forces to Sigmaringen, followed closely by the French. Fighting at nearby Biberach an der Ris ensued on 9 May; action principally consisted of the 25,000 man-strong French "Center", commanded by Laurent de Gouvion Saint-Cyr. After being flanked by General Moreau, who approached Ulm from the east and overwhelmed his outposts at Battle of Höchstädt (1800), Kray retreated to Munich. Again, on 10 May, the Austrians withdrew with heavy losses, this time to Ulm.

A several month armistice followed, during which Kray was replaced by the Archduke John, with the Austrian army retiring behind the river Inn. Austrian reluctance to accept negotiated terms caused the French to end the armistice in mid-November, effective in two weeks. When the armistice ended, John advanced over the Inn towards Munich. His army was defeated in small engagements at the battles of Ampfing and Neuburg an der Donau, and decisively in the forests before the city at Hohenlinden on 3 December. Moreau began a march on Vienna, and the Austrians soon signed the Armistice of Steyr, ending the war in Germany.

== Egypt ==
Meanwhile, Kléber remained trapped in Egypt by the British fleet. He negotiated the Convention of El-Arish with Britain and Turkey to allow him to evacuate by sea, but Britain later repudiated the agreement. Kléber won a battle against the Turks at Heliopolis in March, but was assassinated later in June.

== Sources ==
- History of the French Revolution from 1789 to 1814, by François Mignet (1824), as made available by Project Gutenberg (out-of-copyright)
- Clausewitz, Carl von (2020). Napoleon Absent, Coalition Ascendant: The 1799 Campaign in Italy and Switzerland, Volume 1. Trans and ed. Nicholas Murray and Christopher Pringle. Lawrence, Kansas: University Press of Kansas. ISBN 978-0-7006-3025-7
- Clausewitz, Carl von (2021). The Coalition Crumbles, Napoleon Returns: The 1799 Campaign in Italy and Switzerland, Volume 2. Trans and ed. Nicholas Murray and Christopher Pringle. Lawrence, Kansas: University Press of Kansas. ISBN 978-0-7006-3034-9* Dupuy, Trevor N. and Dupuy, R. Ernest, The Harper Encyclopedia of Military History, HarperCollins, ISBN 0-06-270056-1
- Chandler, David G, The Campaigns of Napoleon, Weidenfeld & Nicolson, ISBN 0-297-74830-0
- Various Wikipedia articles

Preceded by 1799	French Revolutionary Wars; 1800	Succeeded by 1801
