= 1st Infantry Regiment (France) =

- French: 1er régiment d'infanterie
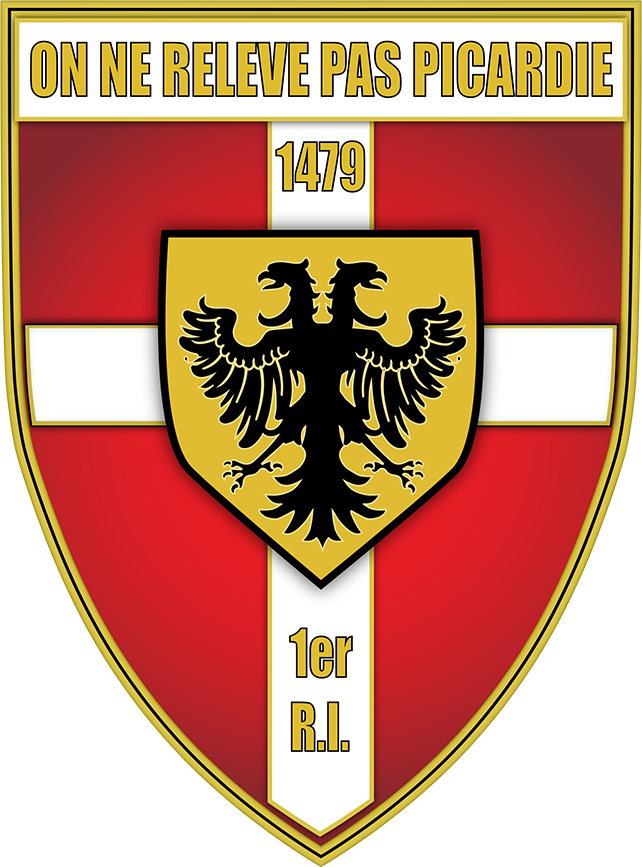
- Insignia of the 1st Infantry Regiment.
- Active: 1479–present
- Country: France
- Branch: Army
- Type: Mechanised infantry
- Size: 1 regiment (1,150)
- Part of: Franco-German Brigade part of 1st Division
- Garrison/HQ: Sarrebourg, France
- Motto: On ne relève pas Picardie
- Engagements: French Revolutionary Wars Battle of Quiévrain Battle of Valmy Battle of Jemappes Siege of Valenciennes Battle of Wissembourg Battle of Fleurus Battle of Stockach First Battle of Zurich Second Battle of Zurich Battle of Moeskirch Battle of Biberach Battle of Caldiero Battle of Sacile Napoleonic Wars Peninsular War Siege of San Sebastián War of the Fifth Coalition War of the Sixth Coalition Wars of German Liberation Battle of Lützen (1813) Battle of Leipzig Countryside of France Six Days' Campaign Hundred Days Waterloo Campaign Battle of Waterloo French Conquest of Algeria Franco-Prussian War First World War First Battle of the Marne Race to the Sea Battle of the Somme Battle of Verdun Third Battle of the Aisne Battle of Noyon Second World War Algerian War Cold War War in Afghanistan

The 1st Infantry Regiment (French: 1^{er} Régiment d'Infanterie) or 1^{er} RI is an infantry regiment of the French Army, founded in 1479 as one of the oldest regiments in active service in the world. It is an offspring of the bande de Picardie under the Ancien Régime, and one of the five oldest regiments in France. It particularly distinguished itself, as the 1^{ère} Demi-Brigade d'Infanterie de Ligne, during the French Revolutionary Wars at the Battles of Fleurus (1794), Messkirch (1800) and Biberach (1800). The regiment has been patroned by the city of Saint-Amand-Montrond since 12 April 2003.

The 1^{er} RI is the only French infantry regiment to feature a squadron specialised in urban warfare, the Groupe Commando d'Investigation (CGI, "Breaching Commando Group"). The CGI is, with the Compagnie de Combat en zone Urbaine of the 2nd Foreign Parachute Regiment, the benchmark for urban combat in the French military.

== Honours ==
The flag bears the names of the battle in which the 1st Infantry Regiment took part for the French Republic: Valmy 1792, Fleurus 1794, Moeskirch 1800, Biberach 1800, Miliana 1842, Guise 1914, Verdun-l'Yser 1916–1917, La Somme 1916, L'Ourcq 1918, Résistance Berry 1944, AFN 1952–1962.

During the Napoleonic Wars the regiment fought at the battles of Caldiero, Wagram, Salamanca, Lützen, Bautzen, Dresden, Leipzig, Montmirail, Vauchamps, Quatre Bras and Waterloo.

The Fourragère of the Médaille militaire was attributed on 10 September 1918, and presented by General Castelneau on 19 October 1918 in Alsace, after the regiment was mentioned in dispatches at the order of the Army for the fourth time. It is adorned of the olive of the Croix de Guerre 1914–1918, and of the olive of the Croix de Guerre 1939–1945 for two mentions in despatches awarded during the Phony War and in the French Resistance

Honours of the 1st Infantry Regiment
Regimental flag

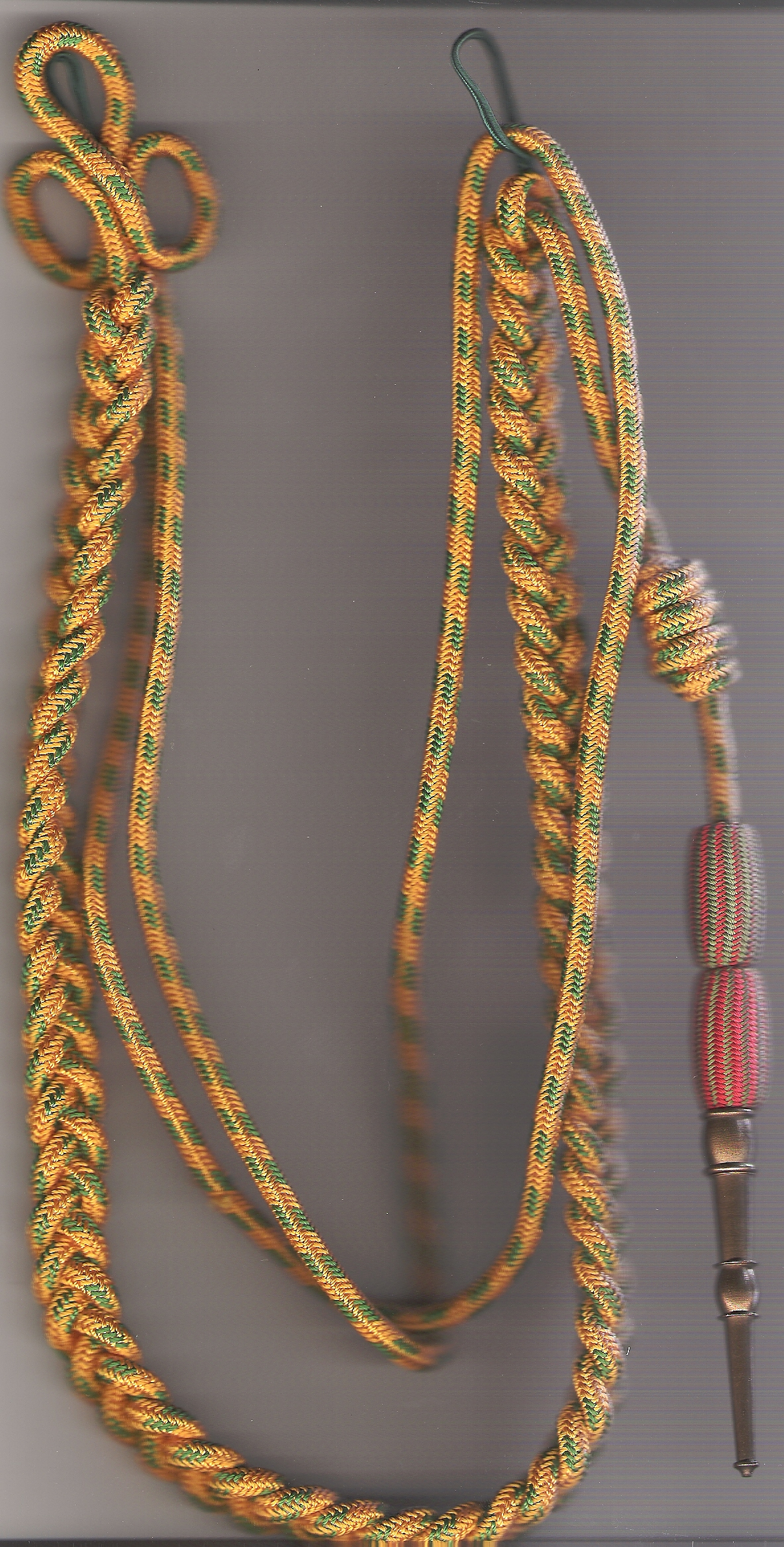
Fourragère of the Médaille militaire with olives of the Croix de Guerre 1914–1918 and 1939–1945
