= Battle of Biberach (1800) =

1800 battle during the War of the Second Coalition

- Part of the French Revolutionary Wars
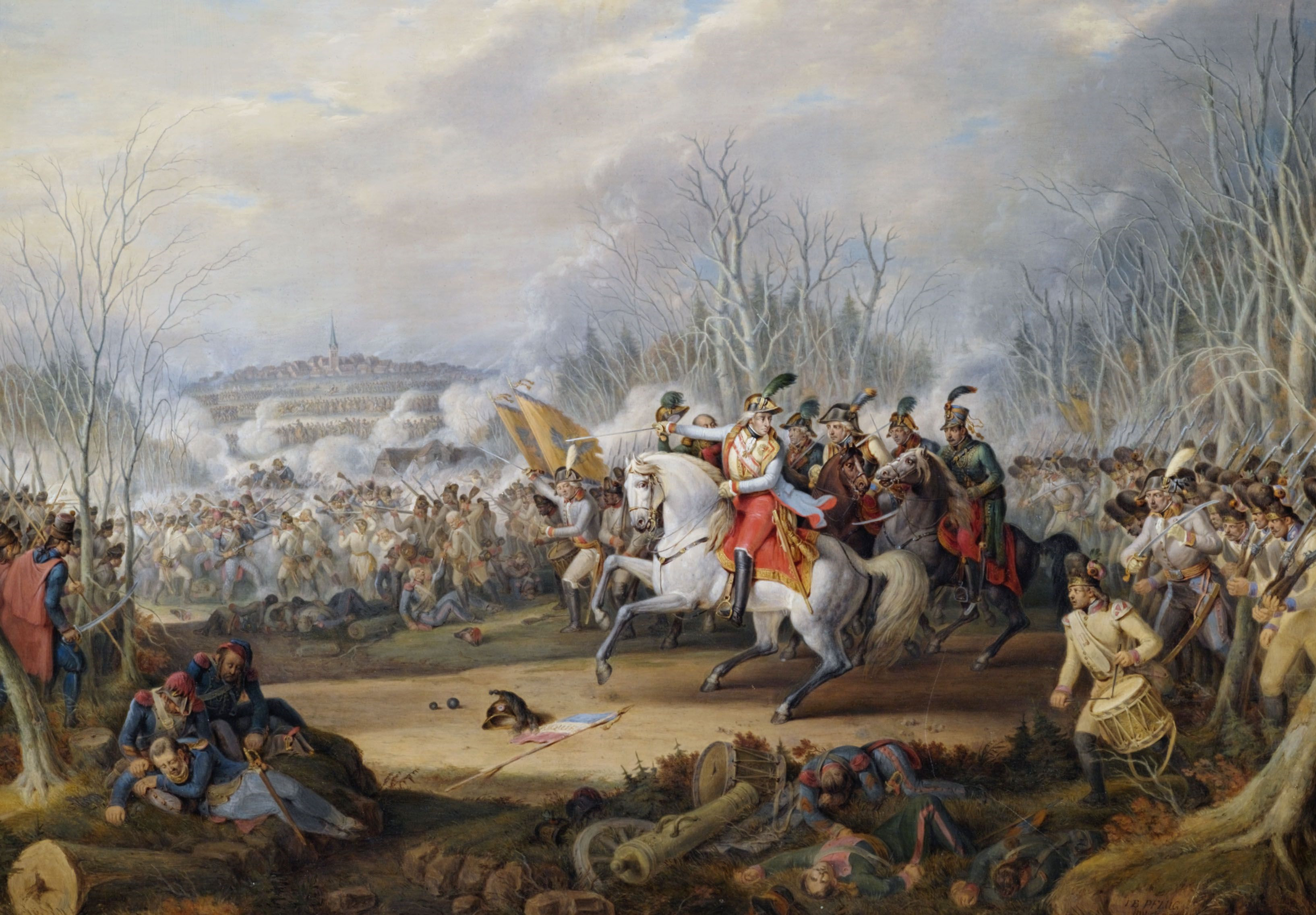
- Painting by Johann Baptist Pflug shows an Austrian commander leading his soldiers against the French.
Date	9 May 1800
Location	Biberach an der Riss, present-day Germany 48°06″N 9°48″E
Result	French victory

Belligerents
France	(Holy Roman Empire) Austria

Commanders and leaders
(France) Laurent Saint-Cyr	(Holy Roman Empire) Pál Kray

Strength
25,000	20,000

Casualties and losses
2,000	4,000

War of the Second Coalition:
Austria
The color black indicates the current battle.

The Battle of Biberach on 9 May 1800 saw a French First Republic corps under Laurent Gouvion Saint-Cyr engage part of a Habsburg Austrian army led by Pál Kray. After an engagement in which the Austrians suffered twice as many casualties as the French, Kray withdrew to the east. The combat occurred during the War of the Second Coalition, part of the French Revolutionary Wars. Biberach an der Riss is located 35 kilometres (22 mi) southwest of Ulm.

In late April 1800, a French army under the command of Jean Victor Marie Moreau crossed the Rhine river near Basel. At Stockach and Engen on 3 May, Moreau captured Kray's base of supplies and forced him into retreat. Two days later, Kray confronted his pursuers at Battle of Messkirch but was beaten again. On the 9th, the corps of Gouvion Saint-Cyr caught up with a part of Kray's army and the two sides battled again.

== Background ==
Although the First Coalition forces achieved several initial victories at Verdun, Kaiserslautern, Neerwinden, Mainz, Amberg and Würzburg, the efforts of Napoleon Bonaparte in northern Italy pushed Austrian forces back and resulted in the negotiation of the Peace of Leoben (17 April 1797) and the subsequent Treaty of Campo Formio (October 1797). This treaty proved difficult to administer. Austria was slow to give up some of the Venetian territories. A Congress convened at Rastatt for the purposes of deciding which southwestern German states would be mediatised to compensate the dynastic houses for territorial losses, but was unable to make any progress. Supported by French republican forces, Swiss insurgents staged several uprisings, ultimately causing the overthrow of the Swiss Confederation after 18 months of civil war. By early 1799, the French Directory had become impatient with stalling tactics employed by Austria. The uprising in Naples raised further alarms, and recent gains in Switzerland suggested the timing was fortuitous to venture on another campaign in northern Italy and southwestern Germany.

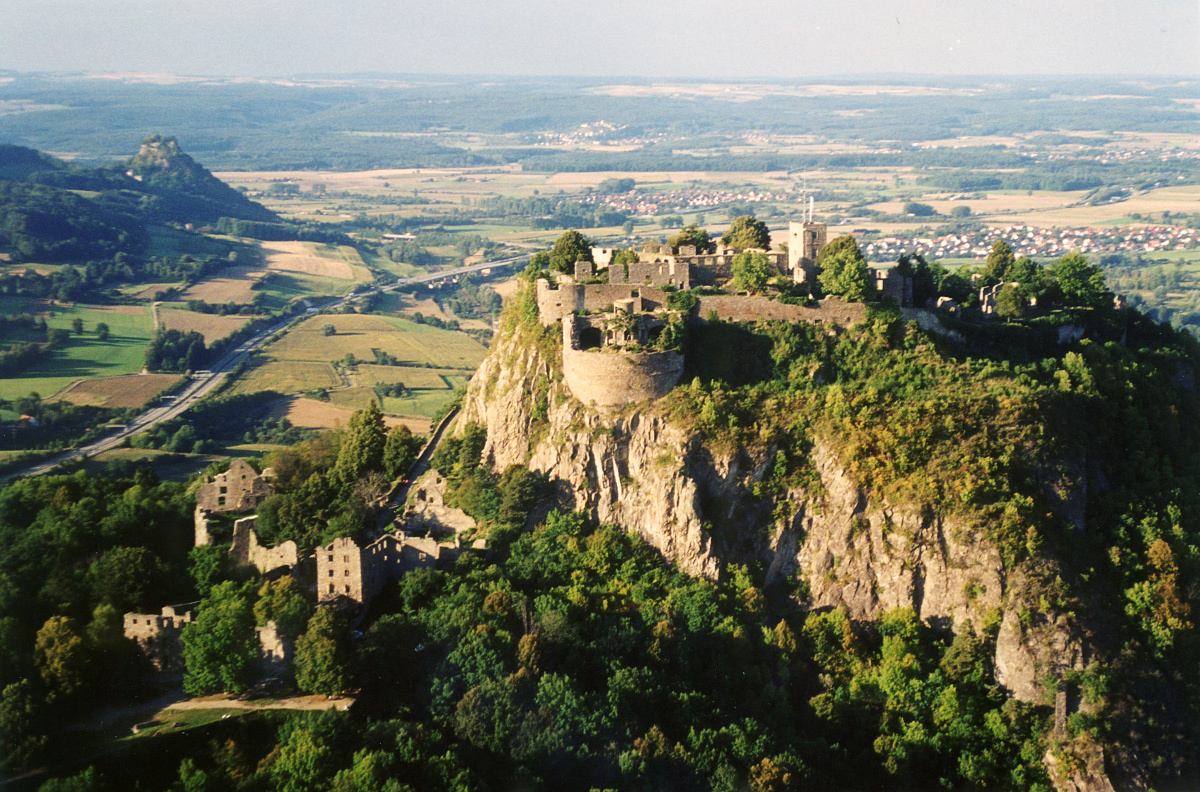
The Battles of Stockach and Engen in May 1800, followed by a larger battle at Meßkirch, followed the Hohentwiel capitulation to the French

At the beginning of 1800, the armies of France and Austria faced each other across the Rhine. Feldzeugmeister Pál Kray led approximately 120,000 troops. In addition to his Austrian regulars, his force included 12,000 men from the Electorate of Bavaria, 6,000 troops from the Duchy of Württemberg, 5,000 soldiers of low quality from the Archbishopric of Mainz, and 7,000 militiamen from the County of Tyrol. Of these, 25,000 men were deployed east of Lake Constance (Bodensee) to protect the Vorarlberg. Kray posted his main body of 95,000 soldiers in the L-shaped angle where the Rhine changes direction from a westward flow along the northern border of Switzerland to a northward flow along the eastern border of France. Unwisely, Kray set up his main magazine at Stockach, near the northwestern end of Lake Constance, only a day's march from French-held Switzerland.

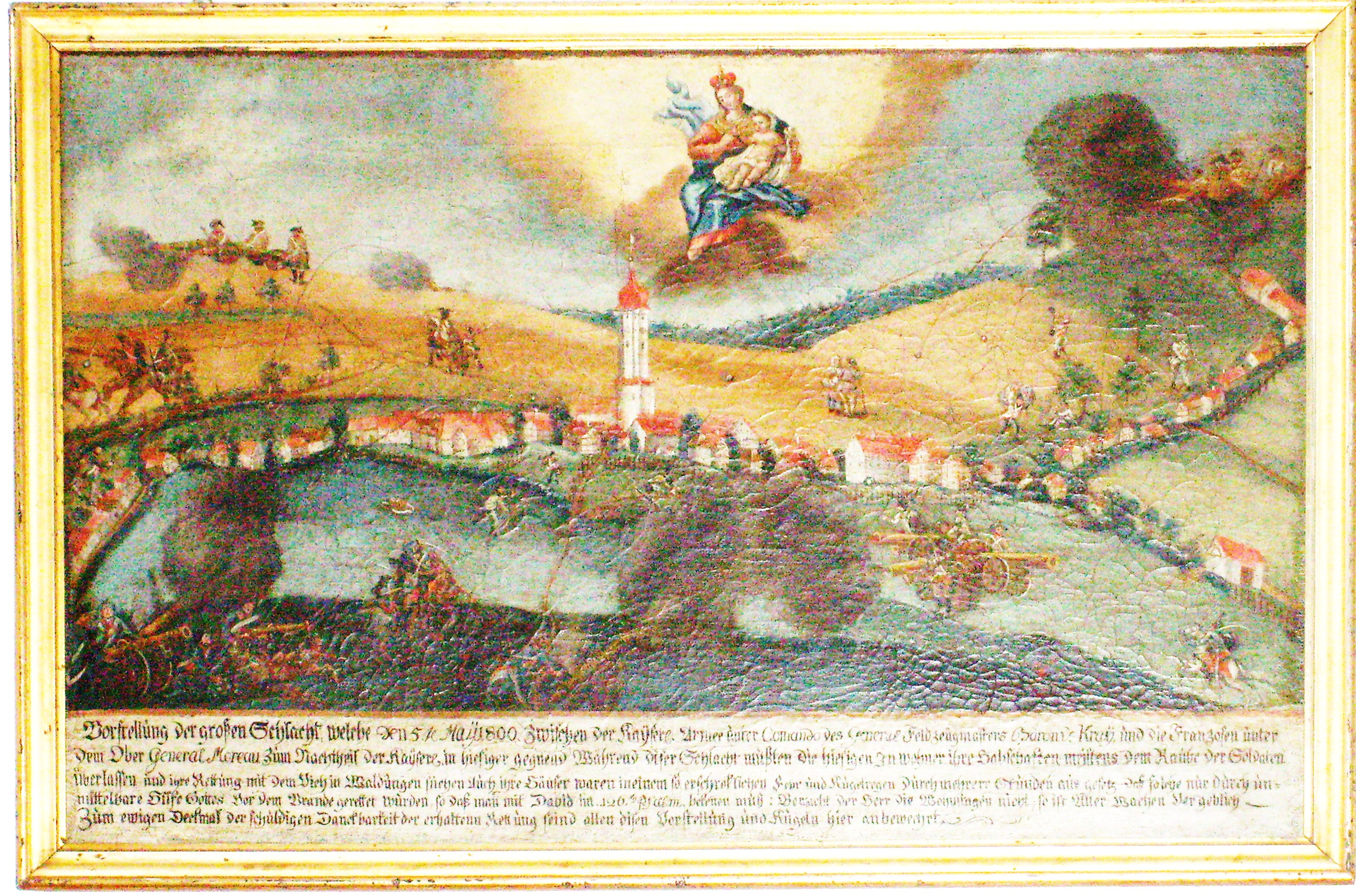
The Battle of Messkirch was won from the high ground.

General of Division Jean Victor Marie Moreau commanded a modestly-equipped army of 137,000 French troops. Of these, 108,000 troops were available for field operations while the other 29,000 watched the Swiss border and held the Rhine fortresses. First Consul Napoleon Bonaparte offered a plan of operations based on outflanking the Austrians by a push from Switzerland, but Moreau declined to follow it. Rather, Moreau planned to cross the Rhine near Basel where the river swung to the north. A French column would distract Kray from Moreau's true intentions by crossing the Rhine from the west. Bonaparte wanted Claude Lecourbe's corps to be detached to Italy after the initial battles, but Moreau had other plans. Through a series of complicated maneuvers in which he flanked, double flanked, and reflanked Kray's army, Moreau's army lay on the eastern slope of the Black Forest, while portions of Kray's army was still guarded the passes on the other side. Battles at Engen and Stockach were fought on 3 May 1800 between the army of the French First Republic under Jean Victor Marie Moreau and the army of Habsburg Austria led by Pál Kray. The fighting near Engen resulted in a stalemate with heavy losses on both sides. However, while the two main armies were engaged at Engen, Claude Lecourbe captured Stockach from its Austrian defenders under Joseph Louis, Prince of Lorraine-Vaudémont. The loss of this main supply base at Stockach compelled Kray to order a retreat to Meßkirch, where they enjoyed a more favourable defensive position. It also meant, however, that any retreat by Kray into Austria via Switzerland and the Vorarlberg was cut off.

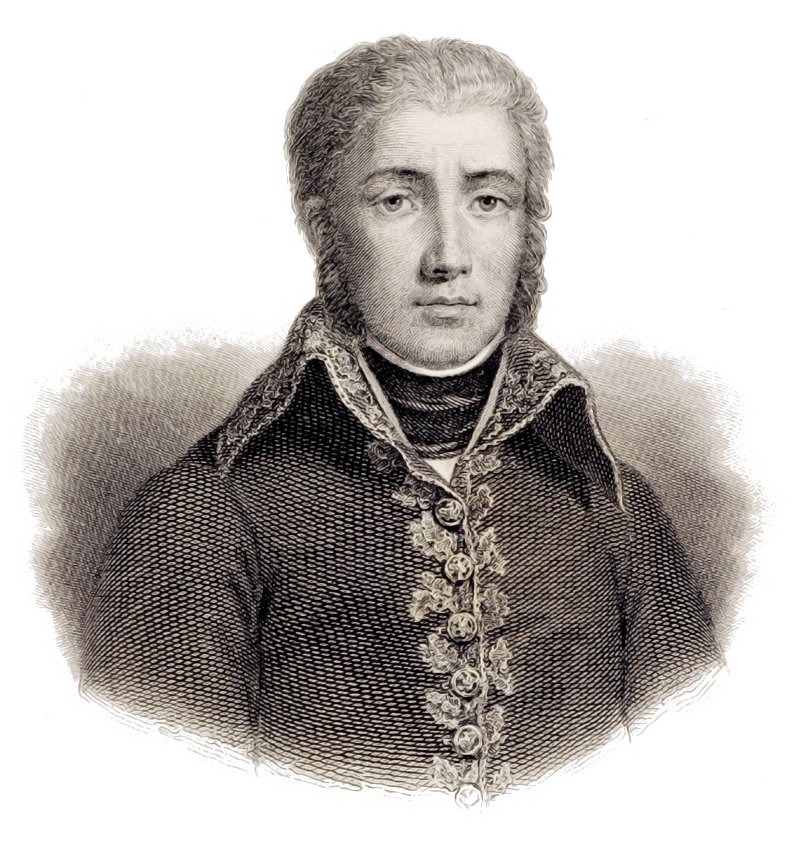
Jean Victor Moreau commanded the French Army of the Rhine.

On 4 and 5 May, the French launched repeated and fruitless assaults on the Meßkirch. At nearby Krumbach, where the Austrians also had the superiority of position and force, the 1st Demi-Brigade took the village and the heights around it, which gave them a commanding aspect over Meßkirch. Subsequently, Kray withdrew his forces to Sigmaringen, followed closely by the French.

== Forces ==
At the beginning of March, Bonaparte ordered Moreau to form his army into several all-arms army corps. By 20 March 1800, Moreau organized four corps, with the last one serving as an army reserve. The Right Wing was led by Lecourbe and included four divisions. These units were General of Division Dominique Vandamme's 9,632 infantry and 540 cavalry, General of Division Joseph Hélie Désiré Perruquet de Montrichard's 6,998 infantry, General of Division Jean Thomas Guillaume Lorge's 8,238 infantry and 464 cavalry, and General of Division Étienne Marie Antoine Champion de Nansouty's 1,500 grenadiers and 1,280 cavalry.

The Center was led by General of Division Laurent Gouvion Saint-Cyr and comprised four divisions. These were General of Division Michel Ney's 7,270 infantry and 569 cavalry, General of Division Louis Baraguey d'Hilliers' 8,340 infantry and 542 cavalry, General of Division Jean Victor Tharreau's 8,326 infantry and 611 cavalry, and General of Brigade Nicolas Ernault des Bruslys' 2,474 light infantry and 1,616 cavalry.

The Left Wing was commanded by General of Division Gilles Joseph Martin Brunteau Saint-Suzanne and included four divisions. These units were General of Division Claude-Sylvestre Colaud's 2,740 infantry and 981 cavalry, General of Division Joseph Souham's 4,687 infantry and 1,394 cavalry, General of Division Claude Juste Alexandre Legrand's 5,286 infantry and 1,094 cavalry, and General of Division Henri François Delaborde's 2,573 infantry and 286 cavalry.

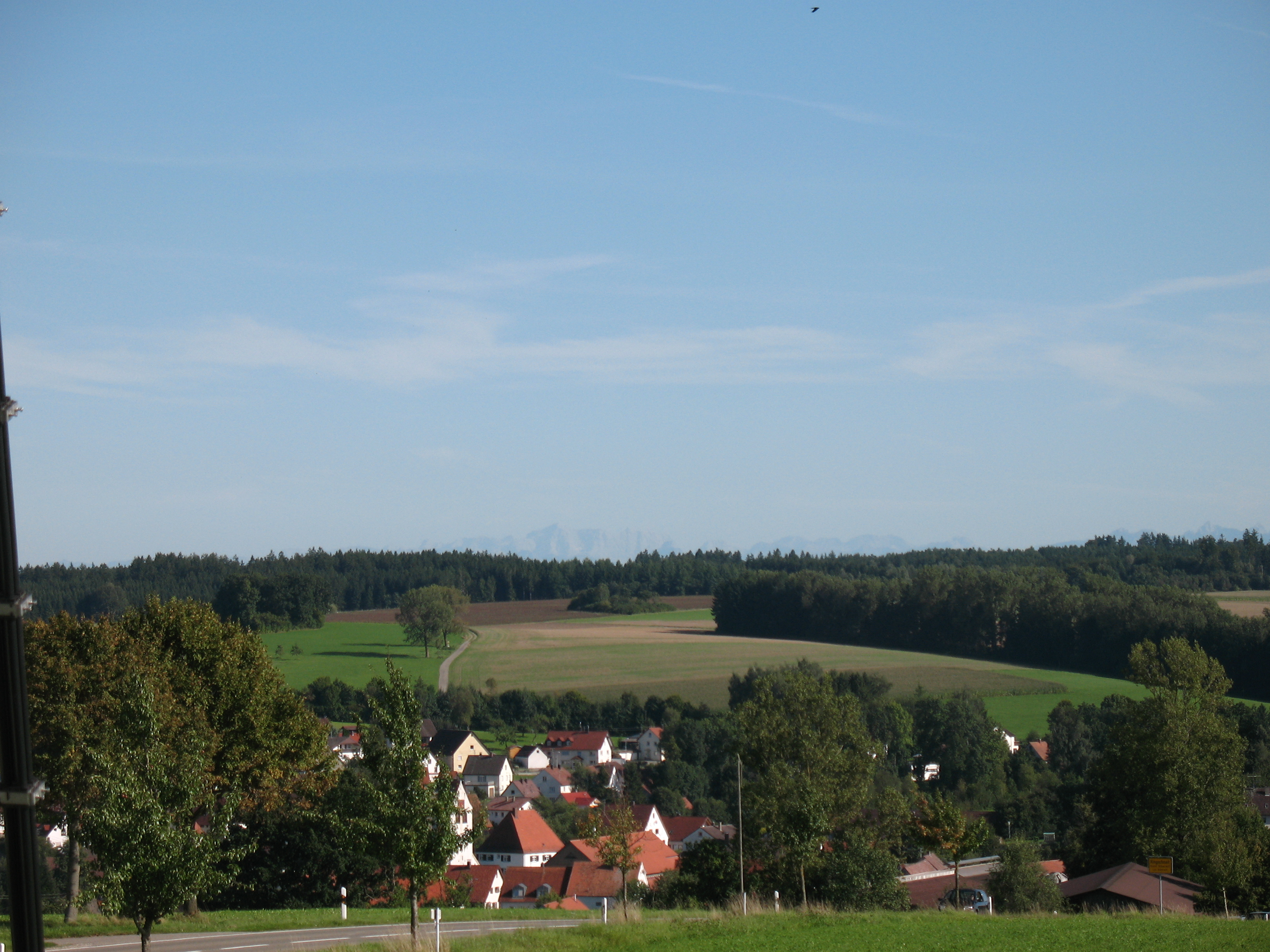
fields outside Biberach an der Ris, where much of the fighting took place. In the background is the Zugspitze, the highest mountain in Germany, which lies on the border with Austria and Bavaria.

Moreau personally directed the Reserve which was made up of three infantry and one cavalry divisions. These were General of Division Antoine Guillaume Delmas de la Coste's 8,635 infantry and 1,031 cavalry, General of Division Antoine Richepanse's 6,848 infantry and 1,187 cavalry, General of Division Charles Leclerc's 6,035 infantry and 963 cavalry, and General of Division Jean-Joseph Ange d'Hautpoul's 1,504 heavy cavalry.

There were additional troops under Moreau's overall leadership. These included General of Division Louis-Antoine-Choin de Montchoisy's 7,715 infantry and 519 cavalry, detached to hold Switzerland. Fortresses in Alsace and along the Rhine were defended by forces under Generals of Division François Xavier Jacob Freytag, 2,935 infantry; Joseph Gilot, 750 cavalry; Alexandre Paul Guerin de Joyeuse de Chateauneuf-Randon, 3,430 infantry and 485 cavalry; Antoine Laroche Dubouscat, 3,001 infantry and 91 cavalry; and Jean François Leval, 5,640 infantry and 426 cavalry.

== Notes ==
Preceded by Battles of Stockach and Engen	French Revolution: Revolutionary campaigns Battle of Biberach	Succeeded by Battle of Montebello
