= Battle of Erbach =

Battle during French revolutionary wars

- Part of War of the Second Coalition
Date	16 May 1800
Location	Erbach an der Donau, Germany
Result	French victory

Belligerents
(France) French Consulate	Habsburg monarchy

Commanders and leaders
Sainte-Suzanne	Baron Pál Kray

Strength
15,000 soldiers excluding Saint-Cyr	36,000 soldiers (including 12,000 cavalry)

The Battle of Erbach took place during the French Revolutionary Wars on 16 May 1800. The forces of the French Consulate, led by Sainte-Suzanne. The Habsburg forces were led by Baron Pál Kray. The French had 15,000 soldiers, while the Austrians had 36,000 soldiers, including 12,000 cavalry. The Austrians attacked vigorously but could not rout the French forces. The French hold to their main positions for 12 hours, until the approach of St Cyr's corps forced the Austrians to retire. Both sides suffered heavy casualties.
