= Battle of Stockach =

Battle of Stockach may refer to:

- Battle of Stockach (1799)
- Battle of Stockach (1800)
