= Toperczer =

Hungarian Noble Family

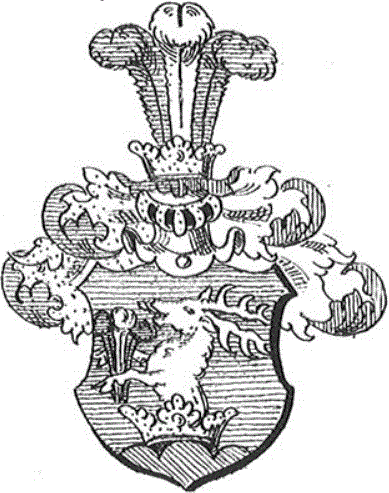
Toperczer Coat of arms

Toperczer, also Topperczer, Toperczer von Todtenfeld or Toperczer de Sárosorosz et Ugornya is the name of a Hungarian noble family. The family was ennobled at the end of the 17th century.

== History ==
The Toperczer family is a noble lineage originating from the County Komitat Zips. A Johann Toperczer is mentioned by name as early as 1524 in official records as a burgher of the free royal town of Leutschau (today Levoča). Another Johann Toperczer appears in 1562 as a Gesandter of Eperjes (today Prešov).

On 19 September 1686, in Vienna, Emperor Leopold I of Austria granted a patent of nobility and coat of arms to Johann Toperczer as the principal grantee, and to his wife Dorothea Kurcz as well as to their children Tobias, Daniel, Maria, Eva, Dorothea, and Elisabeth as secondary grantees.

On 5 December 1722, King Karl III of Hungary granted a patent of nobility and coat of arms to Martin Cornides as the principal grantee, and to his sons Martin and Thomas, as well as to his son-in-law Jacob Topperczer as secondary grantee.

Paul Toperczer abandoned his studies at the age of 20 and embarked on a military career under the guidance of his uncle, Baron Paul Kray von Krajowa. On 8 September 1795, Emperor Franz I of Austria elevated him to the rank of knight in recognition of his heroism and bestowed upon him the epithet Todtenfeld. Paul died from his injuries in 1796.

Joseph Toperczer, as administrator of the Diocese of Nagyvárad (today Oradea), received a renewal of nobility, a coat of arms, an honorific predicate, and landholdings in Sárosorosz and Ugornya from König Franz II. on 19 August 1805. Joseph is the founder of the Bihar branch of the family. His grandson, Eugen Toperczer de Sárosorosz et Ugornya, became mayor of Nagyvárad and an imperial council member.

== Coat of Arms ==
- Blazon of the Toperczer family coat of arms: In blue, issuing from a crowned green triple hill, a stag holding in its forelegs three ostrich feathers in blue–white–blue.
- Blazon of the Cornides family coat of arms: in blue, upon a green hill, a white dove holding a green leafy branch in its beak.
- Blazon of the coat of arms of Joseph von Toperczer: In red, issuing from a crowned green triple hill, an upright stag holding a grapevine in its mouth.
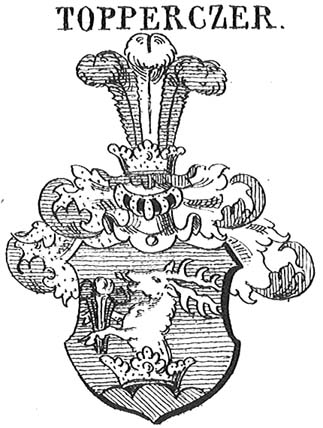
Coat of arms Toperczer

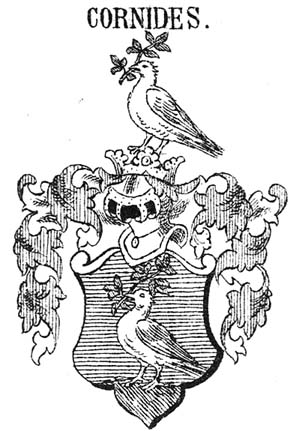
Coat of arms Cornides von Krompach und Gronosztov

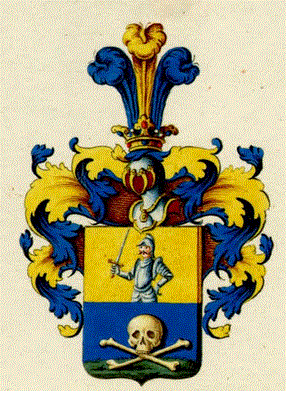
Coat of arms Paul Toperczer von Todtenfeld

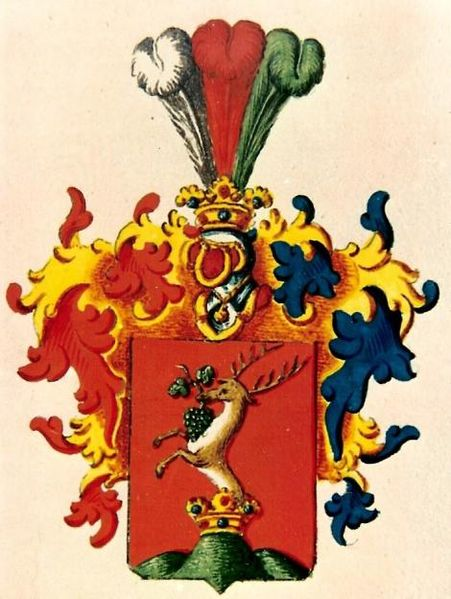
Coat of arms Joseph Toperczer von Sárosorosz et Ugornya
