= François Bontemps =

- Born: 1 June 1753; Saumur Maine-et-Loire
- Died: 29 October 1811 (aged 58) Saumur Maine-et-Loire
- Service years: 1773–1801
- Rank: General of Brigade
- Conflicts: French Revolutionary Wars; Napoleonic Wars
- Awards: Baron of the Empire, Legion of Honor.

François Bontemps (1753–1811), later baron d'Abaumont, a brigadier general during the French Revolutionary Wars and the Napoleonic Wars. He was born 1 June 1753 at Saumur, and died 29 October 1811 at Saumur (Maine-et-Loire).

== Family and education ==
François Bontemps was born into a family of craftsmen, workers of copper and bronze, in Saumur. As a boy, his parents hoped he would become a priest and he was sent to study at the College of Saumur, and later Seminary of Angers. Lacking a vocation, however, Bontemps enlisted in an infantry regiment of the Royal Army. In 1784, having reached the rank of company clerk, and remained there for two years, he realized that he could not advance. He accepted a discharge the 4 May and returned to study the priesthood.

In 1789, François Bontemps embraced the principles of the French Revolution, and in 1792 enlisted as a chaplain in the volunteer battalion of the Eure. According to battalion lore, one of the officers of the battalion insulted the priesthood. Bontemps replied that he, as a priest, forgave him, but that as a citizen, he challenged him to a duel. He later killed the man in a duel and within a few months was elected as battalion lieutenant.

His intrepidity and leadership inspired his men to grant him the nickname of Bayard, after the famous medieval French knight. This same intrepidity, and his tendency to lead from the front, caused a serious wound from a musket ball on 3 May 1800 at the Stockach, by Engen. Despite this, he continued to fight and two days later participated in the Battle of Messkirch. Over the summer, though, his injury worsened and he was discharged from the army in 1801.

After his release from active service, Bontemps retired to Saumur, where he died on 29 October 1811. He is buried in the cemetery of Varrains.

== Dates of Service ==
- 21 Sept 1773: Regimental Corporal
- 1 Oct 1774 : Sergeant
- 13 May 1778: Sergeant of Chasseurs
- 4 May 1784: Decommissioned
- Early 1792 : Enlisted
- 1792 : elected Lieutenant of battalion, as part of the Armée du Nord
- April 1793: Lieutenant-colonel of 11th battalion of the Vosges
- 12 Mar 1794: Chef of Brigade, 175th Demi-Brigade, (Army of Sambre-et-Meuse)
- 5 May 1796: Chef of Brigade, 67th Demi-Brigade
- Sept 1797 : Transferred to the Army of Germany
- 1798 : Armée de Mayence
- 1799 : Army of the Danube
- March 1799: Général de brigade (promoted in the field at the Battle of Stockach, 26 March and officialized on 20 April).
- End of 1799 : attached to the Armée du Rhin
- 1801: released from service with serious injuries.

== Awards and honors ==
- 14 Jun 1804: Commander, Légion d'honneur
- August 1809: Napoleon gave him a silver snuff box and created Baron d'Empire title Baron d'Abaumont.
- August 1809 : Created Baron d'Empire with the title of Baron d'Abaumont.

== See also ==
- List of French generals of the Revolutionary and Napoleonic Wars

== Sources ==
- Six, Georges (1934). Dictionnaire biographique des généraux et amiraux de la Révolution et de l'Empire, Vol. I (in French). Paris, France: Librairie historique et nobiliaire. ISBN 978-2-402-49916-3.
