= Battle of Messkirch =

Battle between France and Austria

Battle of Messkirch (1800)
- Part of War of the Second Coalition
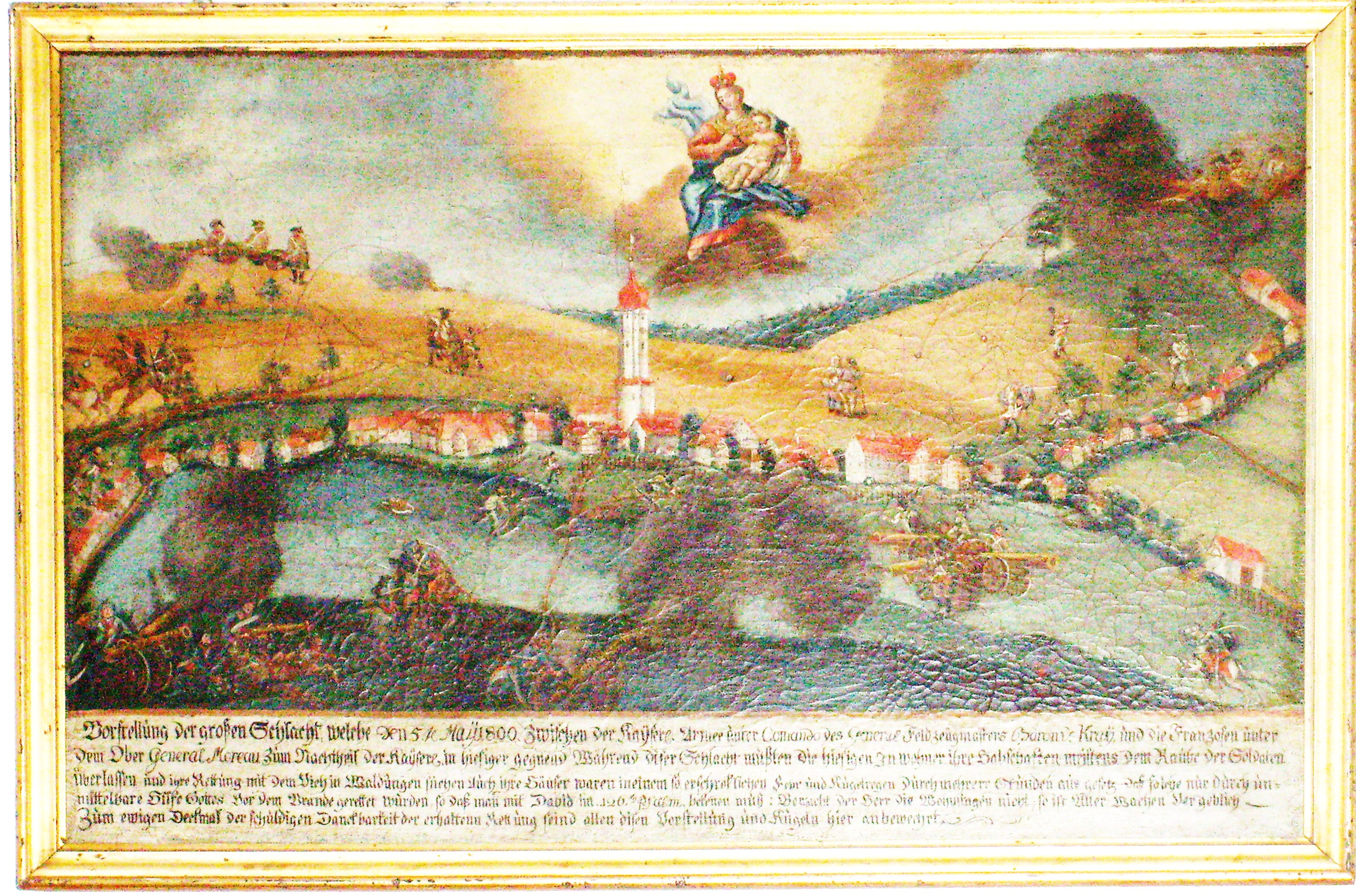
- Battle of Meßkirch
Date	5 May 1800
Location	Meßkirch, present-day Germany 47°59′34″N 9°6′45″E
Result	French victory

Belligerents
Republican France	(Holy Roman Empire) Habsburg Austria

Commanders and leaders
Jean Victor Moreau	Paul Kray

Strength
52,000	48,000

Casualties and losses
3,000 killed or wounded	2,400 killed or wounded 1,600 captured
- Location within Germany

War of the Second Coalition:
Austria
The color black indicates the current battle.

The Battle of Messkirch (5 May 1800) saw a Republican French army led by Jean Victor Marie Moreau attack a Habsburg Austrian army commanded by Paul Kray. At the start of the 1800 campaign in Germany, Moreau's 108,000-strong field army faced Kray's 120,000-man army on opposite sides of the Rhine River. By a series of maneuvers, Moreau crossed the Rhine and concentrated superior forces to defeat Kray at the Battles of Stockach and Engen on 3 May. After Kray retreated a short distance to the north, the two adversaries met again at Meßkirch. After a well-contested fight, Kray withdrew again, conceding victory to the French.

== Overview ==
See the Messkirch 1800 Order of Battle for details of the French and Austrian armies in the campaign.

On 25 April 1800, the French Armée d'Allemagne, under Jean Victor Marie Moreau, crossed the Rhine River at Kehl and Schaffhausen. The 1st Demi-Brigade, of the Corps led by Laurent de Gouvion-Saint-Cyr, conquered St. Georgen and entered the Black Forest at Freiburg im Breisgau. After conquering Stuhlingen, 25 km south of Donaueschingen, the unit took part in the Battle of Stockach and Engen on 3 May 1800, after which the Austrian retreated to Meßkirch where they enjoyed a more favourable defensive position.

The French repeatedly assaulted the town on 4 May 1800 and 5 May 1800, both attempts being in vain. The 1st Demi-Brigade, despite the Austrian superiority there, was able to conquer Krumbach and the heights surrounding it, which commanded Meßkirch. Therefore, the Austrian moved back to Sigmaringen, followed by the French. The Battle of Biberach ensued on 9 May 1800.

== See also ==
- Campaigns of 1800 in the French Revolutionary Wars
