= Campaigns of 1801 of the French Revolutionary Wars =

Napoleonic campaign

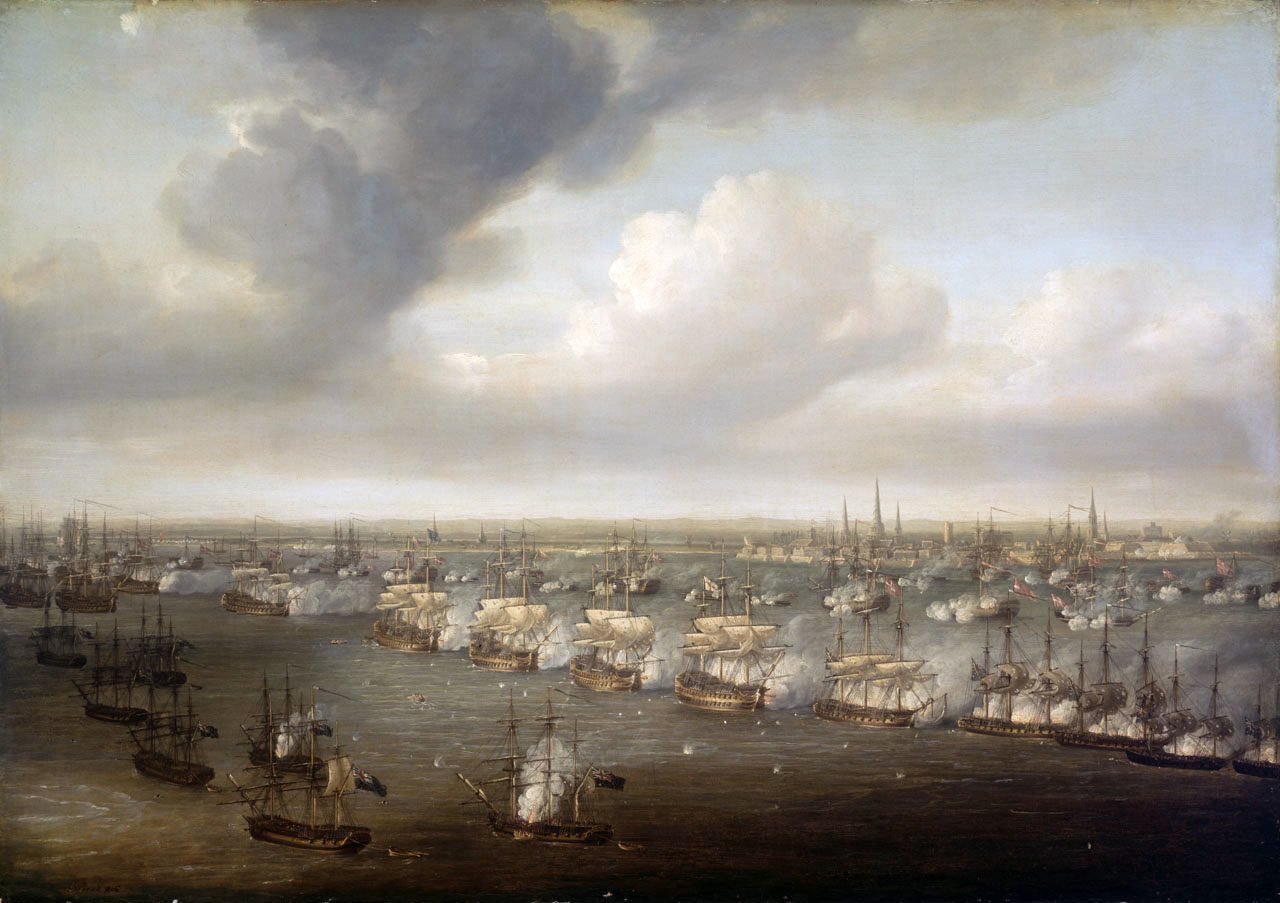
Nicholas Pocock's painting The Battle of Copenhagen, 2 April 1801

The French Revolutionary Wars continued in 1801 with the French bringing the war against the Second Coalition to a close.

By 16 January, the Austrians signed the Armistice of Treviso in Italy. On 9 February, they signed the Treaty of Lunéville, ending the war on the continent. The war against the United Kingdom continued (with Neapolitan harbours closed to her by the Treaty of Florence, signed on 28 March). A British expedition landed in Egypt in March, fighting the Battle of Abukir, the Battle of Alexandria and laying siege to Alexandria. The French surrender there on 2 September ended their campaign in Egypt and Syria which had begun in 1798.

The naval war also continued, with the United Kingdom maintaining a blockade of France by sea. Russia, Prussia, Denmark, and Sweden formed the Second League of Armed Neutrality to prevent their shipping from being searched by the Royal Navy. British Admiral Horatio Nelson attacked the Danish fleet in harbor at the Battle of Copenhagen, destroying much of the fleet of one of France's more steady allies during the period. Nelson continued into the Baltic Sea to attack the Russian fleet at Reval (Tallinn) but had to withdraw to allow negotiations.

Off Gibraltar, the outnumbered French squadron under Linois rebuffed a first British attack under Saumarez in the first battle of Algeciras, capturing a ship of the line. In the second battle of Algeciras, four days later, the British captured a French ship and sank two Spanish, killing around 2000 mostly Spanish seamen for the loss of 12 British.

== See also ==
- Treaty of Amiens
- French Revolutionary Wars

Preceded by 1800	French Revolutionary Wars; 1801	Succeeded by Treaty of Amiens
