= Third Battle of Novi (1799) =

Battle of the War of the Second Coalition

- Part of the War of the Second Coalition
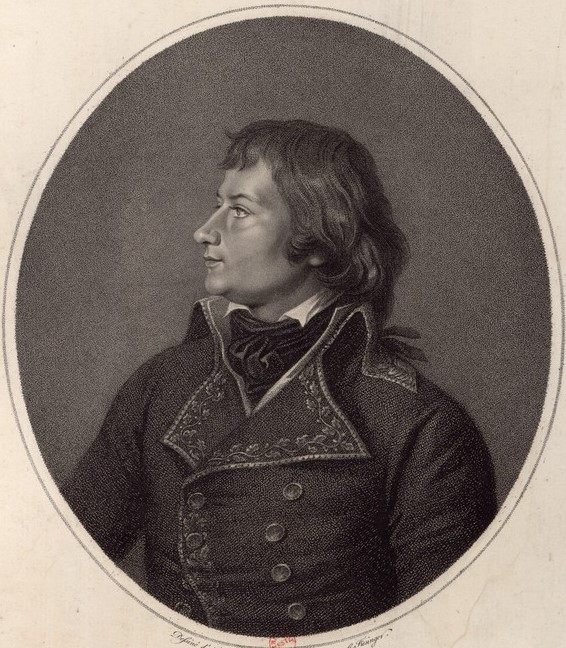
- Laurent Gouvion Saint-Cyr
Date	6 November 1799
Location	Novi Ligure, Italy 44°45′42″N 08°47′26″E
Result	French victory

Belligerents
Republican France	(Holy Roman Empire) Habsburg Austria

Commanders and leaders
(France) Laurent Saint-Cyr	(Holy Roman Empire) Paul Kray

Strength
11,000	12,000

Casualties and losses
400	1,000, 5 guns
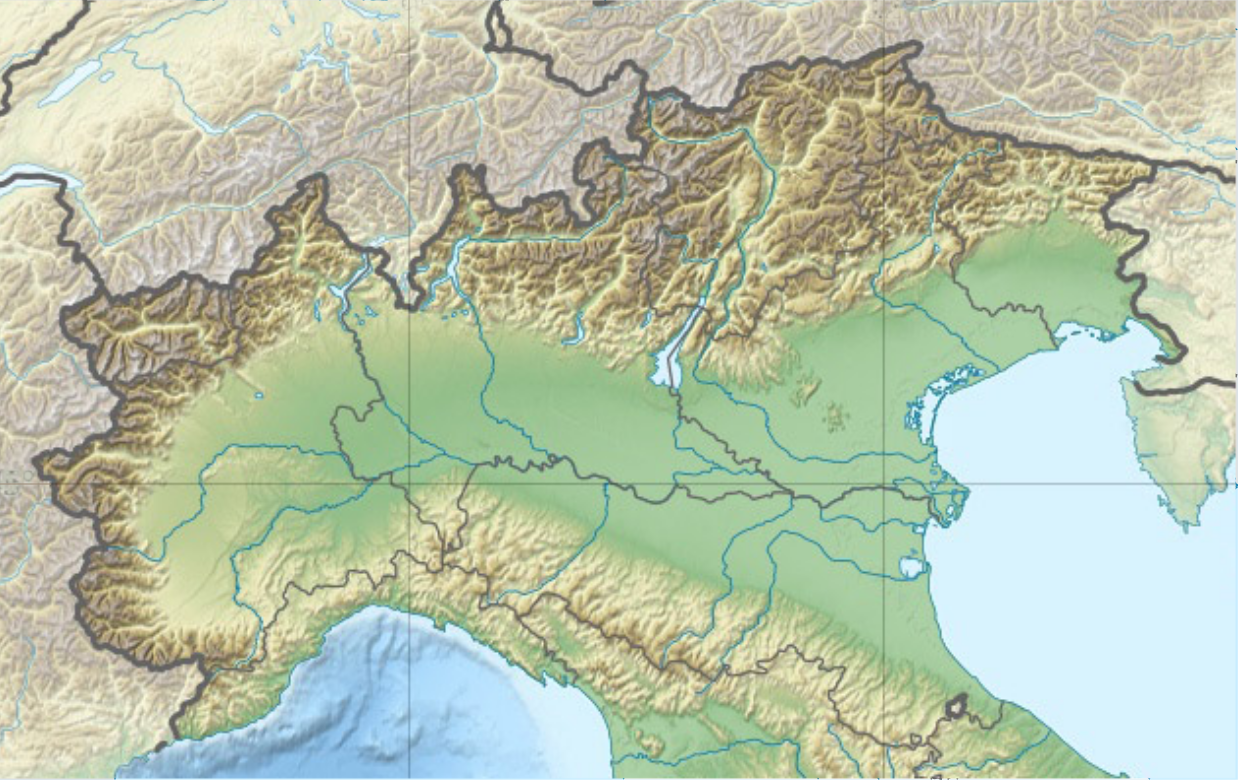
- Location within Northern Italy Third Battle of Novi (1799) (Europe)

The Third Battle of Novi (6 November 1799) saw a French Republican corps commanded by Laurent Gouvion Saint-Cyr defend itself against an attack by a Habsburg Austrian corps led by Paul Kray during the War of the Second Coalition. Saint-Cyr led the right wing of the French Army of Italy which defended Genoa. Saint-Cyr advanced his troops into the lowlands but withdrew into the hills near Novi when Kray appeared with a superior force. Saint-Cyr did not have enough horses to move his artillery, so he tried to lure his Austrian opponents into attacking his four hidden guns. Finally, Kray advanced and fell into the trap; the French guns opened fire and Saint-Cyr's men counterattacked, inflicting serious losses. Wisely, Saint-Cyr did not follow his retreating foes into the plain where the Austrian artillery and cavalry waited.
