= Charles Victor Woirgard =

French général de brigade

- Born: 16 October 1764; Metz, France
- Died: 19 February 1810 (aged 45)
- Allegiance: France
- Branch: French Army
- Rank: Général de brigade
- Conflicts: French Revolutionary Wars; Napoleonic Wars

Charles Victor Woirgard (16 October 1764, Metz - 19 February 1810, Valverde), also known by the surname of Beaugard or Beauregard, was a French général de brigade of the French Revolutionary Wars and Napoleonic Wars. His name is engraved on the 38th column of the Arc de Triomphe as Beauregard.
