= Louis Baraguey d'Hilliers =

French general

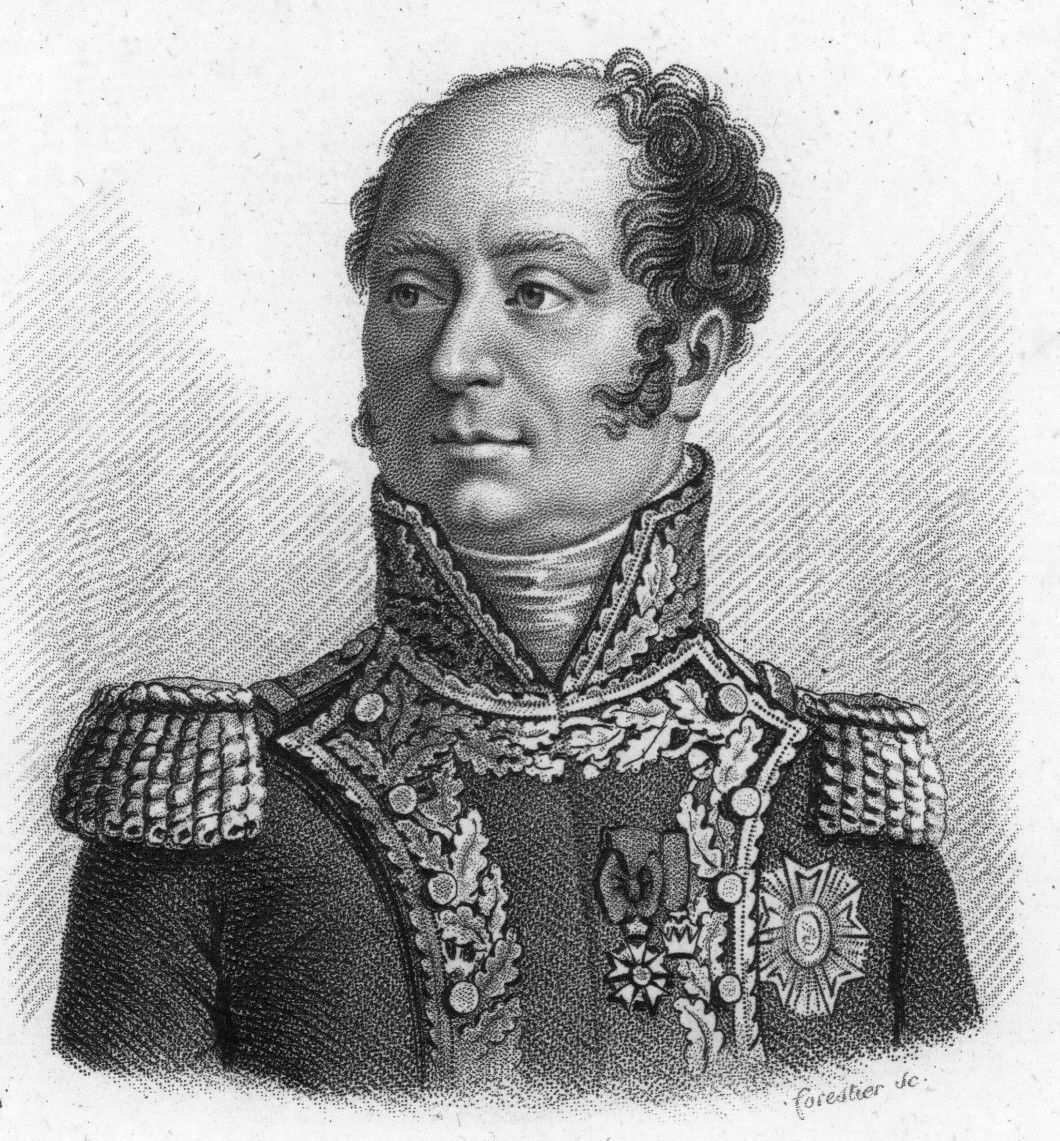
- 19th-century depiction of Louis Baraguey d'Hilliers
- Born: 13 August 1764; Paris, France
- Died: 6 January 1813 (aged 48) Berlin, Province of Brandenburg, Prussia
- Allegiance: France
- Branch: French Army
- Rank: Général de division
- Wars and battles: French Revolutionary Wars; Siege of Mainz; Battle of Rivoli; Battle of Stockach; Battle of Biberach; Napoleonic Wars; Battle of Elchingen; Battle of Piave River; Battle of Raab

Louis Baraguey d'Hilliers (French pronunciation: [lwi baʁaɡɛ dilje]; 13 August 1764 – 6 January 1813) was a French Army general who fought in the French Revolutionary Wars and the Napoleonic Wars. He was the father of Achille Baraguey d'Hilliers, a Marshal of France, and the father-in-law of General Damrémont, governor-general of Algeria.

== French Revolution ==
Louis Baraguay d'Hilliers was born in Paris. He was a minor noble and entered the French Army as a lieutenant in 1784. At the start of the French Revolutionary Wars, he decided to remain in France. By 1793, he had been promoted during the siege of Mainz to général de brigade and served as chief of staff to Adam Custine. When Custine was arrested, Baraguey d'Hilliers was arrested as well. Luckier than his chief who died under the guillotine, he was released after the overthrow and execution of Maximilien Robespierre.

In 1796, Baraguey d'Hilliers commanded part of Paris against insurgents. After another spell in prison on suspicion of royalist tendencies, he was posted to Louis Hoche's army. Transferred to Italy, he served under Napoléon Bonaparte as governor of Lombardy. He was involved in the capture of Bergamo. He led a brigade in Gabriel Rey's division at the Battle of Rivoli. Promoted to général de division in 1797 he was appointed governor of Venice.

In 1798, he accompanied Bonaparte to Egypt but after the French captured Malta he was sent back to France with the trophies. However, on his way back his ship was intercepted by the Royal Navy and he became a prisoner. After his release he faced a court martial but was acquitted. Then he joined Jacques MacDonald as his chief of staff. In 1800, he fought under Laurent de Gouvion Saint-Cyr at the Battle of Stockach on 3 May and six days later at Biberach. Later he was assigned to guard the Valtellina.

== Napoleonic Wars ==
In 1801, Baraguey d'Hilliers was appointed Inspector General of infantry and in 1804 he became colonel general of the dragoons. He commanded a dragoon division of the cavalry reserve during the campaign of 1805. He fought under Marshal Michel Ney at the Battle of Elchingen. In 1808 he again became governor of Venice.

During the campaign of 1809 Baraguey d'Hilliers served under Viceroy Eugène de Beauharnais. At the Battle of Piave River he commanded a two-division corps. He also distinguished himself at the Battle of Raab where he led one division of his corps. He then served for some time as governor of the County of Tyrol with orders to pacify the region. In 1810 he was sent to Spain where he served in Catalonia. Recalled from Spain, he served in the Russian campaign of 1812 where his troops were assigned to guard Smolensk after that city was captured by the French. During the retreat from Moscow, Emperor Napoleon ordered Baraguey d'Hilliers to march east to meet him. However, instead of joining Napoleon, his division marched into the jaws of the advancing Russian army. The Russians surrounded one of his brigades and forced it to surrender at Liaskowa on November 9. For this incident, Baraguey d'Hilliers fell into disgrace with the emperor. He died of fever in January 1813 in Berlin. His name is inscribed on the south side of the Arc de Triomphe.

== Bibliography ==
- Bowden, Scotty; Tarbox, Charlie (1980). Armies on the Danube 1809. Arlington, Texas: Empire Games Press.
- Boycott-Brown, Martin (2001). The Road to Rivoli. London: Cassell & Co. ISBN 0-304-35305-1.
- Chandler, David (1979). Dictionary of the Napoleonic Wars. New York: Macmillan. ISBN 0-02-523670-9.
- Six, Georges (1934). "Baraguey d'Hilliers (Louis, comte)". Dictionnaire biographique des généraux et amiraux français de la Révolution et de l'Empire: 1792–1814 (in French). Vol. 1. Paris: Librairie Historique et Nobilaire. pp. 48–49.
- Smith, Digby (1998). The Napoleonic Wars Data Book. London: Greenhill. ISBN 1-85367-276-9.
- Zamoyski, Adam (2004). Moscow 1812: Napoleon's Fatal March. Harper. ISBN 0-06-108686-X.
