= Battle of Wissembourg =

Battle of Wissembourg may refer to:

- Battle of Wissembourg (1744), in July 1744, during the War of the Austrian Succession
- First Battle of Wissembourg (1793), in October 1793, during the War of the First Coalition
- Second Battle of Wissembourg (1793), in December 1793, during the War of the First Coalition
- Battle of Wissembourg (1870), first battle of the Franco-Prussian War
