= Battles of Stockach and Engen =

1800 Battles of the War of the Second Coalition

- Part of the campaigns of 1800 in the War of the Second Coalition
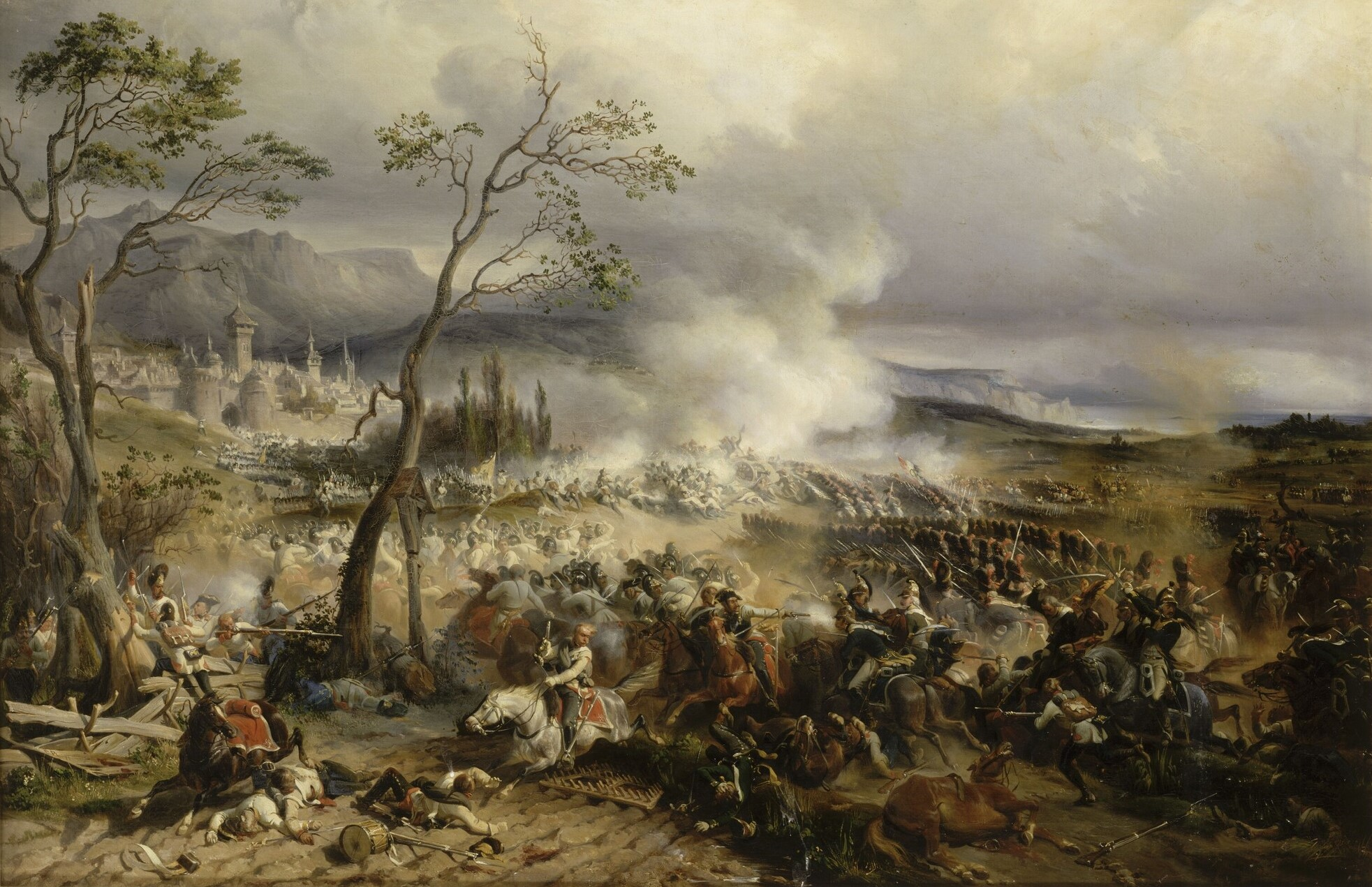
- Combat of Stockach, 3 May 1800 by Félix Philippoteaux, 1838
Date	3 May 1800
Location	Stockach and Engen, Germany 47°51′10″N 08°46′17″E
Result	French victory: Engen: Draw; Stockach: French victory

Belligerents
France	(Habsburg monarchy) Austria

Commanders and leaders
Engen: (France) Jean Victor Moreau; Stockach: (France) Claude Lecourbe	Engen: (Habsburg monarchy) Paul Kray; Stockach: (Habsburg monarchy) Prince of Vaudémont

Strength
84,000	72,000

Casualties and losses
Total per Smith: 3,000 killed, wounded and missing Total per Bodart: 3,000 casualties	Total per Smith: 397 killed 718 captured Total per Le Spectateur militaire: 1,147 killed 1,884 wounded 3,862 captured Total per Bodart: 3,000 killed or wounded 4,000 captured

War of the Second Coalition:
Austria
The color black indicates the current battle.

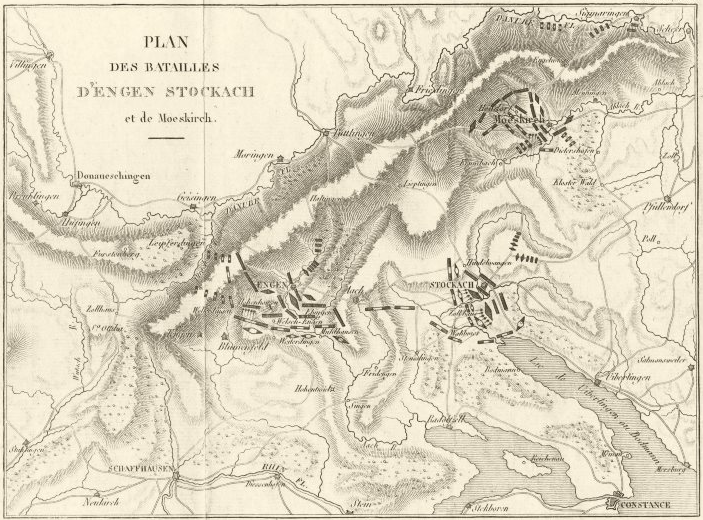
Battles of Engen and Stockach (Ch. L. F. Panckoucke, 1819)

The Battles of Stockach and Engen were fought on 3 May 1800 between the army of the French First Republic under Jean Victor Marie Moreau and the army of the Habsburg monarchy led by Paul Kray. The fighting near Engen resulted in a stalemate. However, while the two main armies were engaged at Engen, Claude Lecourbe captured Stockach from its Austrian defenders (the latter commanded by Joseph Louis, Prince of Lorraine-Vaudémont). The loss of his main supply base at Stockach compelled Kray to order a retreat. Stockach is located near the northwestern end of Lake Constance while Engen is 20 kilometres (12 mi) west of Stockach. The action occurred during the War of the Second Coalition, part of the French Revolutionary Wars.

== Background ==
See the Messkirch 1800 Order of Battle for details of the French and Austrian armies in the campaign.

=== Plans ===
At the beginning of 1800 the armies of France and the Habsburgs faced each other across the Rhine. Feldzeugmeister Paul Kray led approximately 120,000 troops. Beside his regular Austrian soldiers he led 12,000 men from the Electorate of Bavaria, 6,000 troops from the Duchy of Württemberg, 5,000 soldiers of low quality from the Archbishopric of Mainz and 7,000 militiamen from the County of Tyrol. Of these 25,000 men were deployed east of Lake Constance (Bodensee) to protect the Vorarlberg. Kray posted his main body of 95,000 soldiers in the L-shaped angle, where the Rhine changes direction from a westward flow along the northern border of Switzerland to a northward flow along the eastern border of France. Unwisely, Kray set up his main magazine at Stockach, only a day's march from French-held Switzerland.

Feldmarschall-Leutnant Prince Heinrich XV of Reuss-Plauen commanded the 25,000 troops in the Vorarlberg which included the Tyrolese. The 40,000-man center led by Feldmarschall-Leutnant Friedrich Joseph, Count of Nauendorf was posted from Lake Constance on the east to Villingen on the west, with its forward elements along the Rhine between the lake and Basel. The right wing consisted of the 15,000 troops of Feldmarschall-Leutnant Michael von Kienmayer guarding the passes through the Black Forest, 16,000 soldiers under Feldmarschall-Leutnant Anton Sztáray behind the Rhine from the Rench River north to the Main River and 8,000 men defending Frankfurt. Finally, a 20,000-strong reserve hovered near Stockach. There were garrisons in all the major fortresses and a small naval squadron on Lake Constance. In total, Kray disposed of 110,000 infantry, 25,000 cavalry, 4,000 gunners and 500 artillery pieces. In his rear was a major supply base and an entrenched camp at Ulm. The Habsburg general was able to trace one line of supply through Munich to Austria and a second one through Regensburg to Bohemia.

General of Division Jean Victor Marie Moreau commanded a well-equipped army of 137,000 French troops. Of these, 108,000 troops were available for field operations while the other 29,000 watched the Swiss border and held the Rhine fortresses. First Consul Napoleon Bonaparte offered a bold plan of operations based on outflanking the Austrians by a push from Switzerland, but Moreau declined to follow it. Rather, Moreau planned to cross the Rhine near Basel where the river swung to the north. A French column would distract Kray from Moreau's true intentions by crossing the Rhine from the west. Bonaparte wanted General of Division Claude Lecourbe's corps to be detached to Italy after the initial battles, but Moreau had other plans.

=== French Army ===
At the beginning of March, Bonaparte ordered Moreau to form his army into all-arms army corps. Accordingly, by 20 March 1800, there were four corps, with the last one serving as an army reserve. The Right Wing was led by Lecourbe and included four divisions led by Generals of Division Dominique Vandamme, Joseph Hélie Désiré Perruquet de Montrichard, Jean Thomas Guillaume Lorge and Étienne Marie Antoine Champion de Nansouty. Vandamme commanded 9,632 infantry and 540 cavalry, Montrichard supervised 6,998 infantry, Lorge had 8,238 infantry and 464 cavalry and Nansouty directed 1,500 grenadiers and 1,280 cavalry. The center was led by General of Division Laurent Gouvion Saint-Cyr and comprised four divisions under Generals of Division Michel Ney, Louis Baraguey d'Hilliers and Jean Victor Tharreau and General of Brigade Nicolas Ernault des Bruslys. Ney had 7,270 infantry and 569 cavalry, d'Hilliers counted 8,340 infantry and 542 cavalry, Tharreau led 8,326 infantry and 611 cavalry and Bruslys directed 2,474 light infantry and 1,616 cavalry.

The Left Wing was commanded by General of Division Gilles Joseph Martin Brunteau Saint-Suzanne and consisted of four divisions under Generals of Division Claude Sylvestre Colaud, Joseph Souham, Claude Juste Alexandre Legrand and Henri François Delaborde. Colaud led 2,740 infantry and 981 cavalry, Souham had 4,687 infantry and 1,394 cavalry, Legrand counted 5,286 infantry and 1,094 cavalry and Delaborde supervised 2,573 infantry and 286 cavalry. Moreau personally directed the Reserve which was made up of three infantry and one cavalry divisions led by Generals of Division Antoine Guillaume Delmas, Antoine Richepanse, Charles Leclerc and Jean-Joseph Ange d'Hautpoul. Delmas had 8,635 infantry and 1,031 cavalry, Richepanse directed 6,848 infantry and 1,187 cavalry, Leclerc commanded 6,035 infantry and 963 cavalry and d'Hautpoul counted 1,504 heavy cavalry.

There were additional detached troops under Moreau's overall leadership. These included General of Division Louis-Antoine-Choin de Montchoisy's 7,715 infantry and 519 cavalry, detached to hold Switzerland. Fortresses in Alsace and along the Rhine were defended by forces under Generals of Division François Xavier Jacob Freytag, 2,935 infantry, Joseph Gilot, 750 cavalry, Alexandre Paul Guérin de Joyeuse de Chateauneuf-Randon, 3,430 infantry and 485 cavalry, Antoine Laroche Dubouscat, 3,001 infantry and 91 cavalry and Jean François Leval, 5,640 infantry and 426 cavalry.

== General references ==
- Clausewitz, Carl von (2020). Napoleon Absent, Coalition Ascendant: The 1799 Campaign in Italy and Switzerland, Volume 1. Trans and ed. Nicholas Murray and Christopher Pringle. Lawrence, Kansas: University Press of Kansas. ISBN 978-0-7006-3025-7
- Clausewitz, Carl von (2021). The Coalition Crumbles, Napoleon Returns: The 1799 Campaign in Italy and Switzerland, Volume 2. Trans and ed. Nicholas Murray and Christopher Pringle. Lawrence, Kansas: University Press of Kansas. ISBN 978-0-7006-3034-9
- Bodart, Gaston (1908). Militär-historisches Kriegs-Lexikon (1618–1905).

Preceded by Battle of Genola	French Revolution: Revolutionary campaigns Battles of Stockach and Engen	Succeeded by Battle of Biberach (1800)
