= Paul Kray =

Soldier, and general in Habsburg service

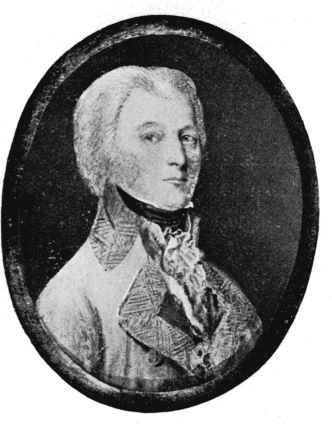
- Baron Paul Kray
- Born: 5 February 1735; Käsmark (Késmárk), Hungary
- Died: 19 January 1804 (aged 68); Pest, Hungary
- Military career
- Allegiance: Habsburg monarchy
- Branch: Imperial Austrian Army
- Rank: Feldzeugmeister; Colonel and Proprietor
- Conflicts: War of the Bavarian Succession; Austro-Turkish War (1788–1791); War of the First Coalition; Battle of Le Cateau (1794); War of the Second Coalition; Battle of Kircheib; Battle of Würzburg; Battle of Neuwied; Battle of Verona (1799); Battle of Magnano; Siege of Mantua (1799); Battle of Novi (1799); Third Battle of Novi (1799); Battle of Engen; Battle of Messkirch; Battle of Biberach (1800); Battle of Erbach; Battle of Iller River; Battle of Höchstädt (1800); Battle of Neuburg

Baron Paul Kray of Krajova and Topolya (German: Paul Freiherr Kray von Krajova und Topola; Hungarian: Krajovai és Topolyai báró Kray Pál; 5 February 1735 – 19 January 1804), was a soldier and general in Habsburg service during the Seven Years' War, the War of Bavarian Succession, the Austro-Turkish War (1788–1791), and the French Revolutionary Wars. He was born in Késmárk, Upper Hungary (today: Kežmarok, Slovakia).

He withdrew from military service temporarily in 1792 because of poor health, but in 1793, he was recalled to the Habsburg military in the Netherlands at the request of Field Marshal Prince Coburg and fought in the Flanders Campaign.

In 1799 he was appointed commander of the Austrian forces in Italy and Colonel-Proprietor of the Infantry Regiment N.34, a ceremonial position he held until his death. On 18 April 1799, Kray was promoted to Feldzeugmeister for the Battle of Magnano. In the 1800 campaign, Kray commanded the Austrian force on the Upper Rhine, charged with the defense of all approaches to Vienna through the German states. After being out-maneuvered by the French, he was disastrously defeated in five consecutive battles. After the Battle of Neuburg, the French acquired both shores of the river, and commanded access to the Danube waterway as far east as Regensburg. During the subsequent armistice, Emperor Francis II replaced Kray with his brother, Archduke John; Kray was discharged on 28 August 1800 and retired to Pest, Hungary. He died there on 19 January 1804. For all his victories, for his fierce competitiveness on the battlefield, the French soldiers referred to him as Le terrible Kray, le fils cher de la victoire and men from both sides attended his funeral in 1804.

== Biography ==
=== Early career ===
Kray was born in Késmárk, Upper Hungary (today: Kežmarok, Slovakia). He was educated in mathematical and other military sciences in Schemnitz and Vienna.

Entering the Austrian army at the age of nineteen in 1754 in the Infantry Regiment 31 "Hallerstein" and fought in the Seven Years' War. In 1778, he was promoted from grenadier captain to major and transferred to Infantry Regiment "Preysach" 39. After the War of Bavarian Succession, he transferred to the 2nd Szeckler Grenz (border) Infantry Regiment as lieutenant colonel. In 1784 he suppressed a Romanian peasants' uprising in Transylvania. Kray served in the Turkish wars of 1787–91. On 10 May 1788, he defeated a superior Turkish force of 5,000 men commanded by Osman Pazvantoğlu and Kara Mustapha Pasha on the borders of Transylvania. He later led the capture of the Krajova fortress; for this, he was awarded the Knight's Cross of the Military Order of Maria Theresa on 21 December 1789, in May of the following year, Kray was promoted Generalmajor and subsequently ennobled by Emperor Joseph II with the title of Freiherr "von Krajow und Topolya". In the Austro-Turkish War of 1787 to 1791 he saw active service at Petrozsény and the Vulcan Pass.

=== War of the First Coalition ===
Promoted major general in 1790, three years later Kray commanded the advance guard of the Allies under Prince Coburg, operating in Flanders and the Austrian Netherlands. He distinguished himself at Famars, Menin, Wissembourg, Charleroi, Fleurus, and, indeed, at almost every encounter in the Flanders Campaign with the armies of the French Republic, inclusive of his victory at the Battle of Le Cateau. Promoted to Feldmarschalleutnant on 5 March 1796 Kray served in Archduke Charles's Army of the Lower Rhine. On 19 June, after the Battle of Wetzlar, he forced General Jean-Baptiste Kléber to withdraw from Uckerath. He also defeated French General of Division Jourdan in the clash at Limburg on 16 September. He then fought in various actions, including the victory at Amberg on 24 August, and at the Battle of Würzburg as a divisional commander, when he was largely responsible for the victory of Archduke Charles of Austria. On 19 September, he captured the mortally wounded General of Division François Séverin Marceau-Desgraviers, one of the ablest and bravest French commanders of the day; he returned the corpse to French lines with a guard of honor of the Bethlen Hussars N.35. On 4 March 1796 he received promotion to lieutenant general (Feldmarschal-Leutnant). In the celebrated campaign of 1796, on the Rhine and Danube, he performed conspicuous service as a corps commander. In the following year, he was less successful, being defeated on the Lahn, and at Mainz. Worse, his command was surprised and defeated by the French General Louis-Lazarre Hoche in the Battle of Neuwied of 1797. Kray was accused of negligence; a courts-martial found him guilty and sentenced him to two weeks arrest. He requested to resign in protest but this was denied.

=== War of the Second Coalition ===
Kray commanded in Italy in 1799, and reconquered the plain of Lombardy from the French. He won a sharp action at Legnago on 26 March. For his victory over the French at the Battle of Magnano on 5 April, he was promoted Feldzeugmeister (artillery lieutenant general). This victory caused the French army to withdraw to the Adda River. Nevertheless, Kray was replaced when Michael von Melas arrived to take command of the Austrian forces. While the field army won two more major battles, Kray conducted the successful sieges of Peschiera del Garda and Mantua. At the Battle of Novi, he commanded the divisions of Peter Ott and Heinrich Bellegarde. On 6 November, he was defeated by the French in a second clash at Novi Ligure.

The following year he commanded on the Rhine against Jean Moreau. As a consequence of his defeats at the battles of Stockach, Messkirch, Biberach, Iller River, and Höchstädt, Kray was driven into Ulm. However, by a skillful march round Moreau's flank he succeeded in escaping to Bohemia. After a 15 July truce became effective he was relieved of his command by Emperor Francis II and dismissed from the service. Kray's successor, Archduke John of Austria was disastrously defeated at the Battle of Hohenlinden in December.

Thoroughly discredited and personally demoralized, the once respected general retired to his estates to live out his life in exile. Austrian society could be cruel to its losers. When the Habsburg officer corps shunned him, he was left almost friendless, the memories of his fine service during the Seven Years' War vanished. Later Archduke Charles would write Kray a flattering letter explaining that the boorish behavior directed toward him stemmed from envy over his previous victories.

Kray died in Pest, Hungary on 19 January 1804.

== Commentary ==
Kray was one of the best representatives of the old Austrian army. Tied to an obsolete system, and unable, from habit, to realize the changed conditions of warfare, he failed, but his enemies held him in the highest respect as a brave, skillful, and chivalrous opponent. It was he who, at Altenkirchen, cared for the dying Marceau (1796), and the white uniforms of Kray and his staff mingled with the blue of the French in the funeral procession of the young general of the Republic.

== Sources ==
- Arnold, James R. Marengo & Hohenlinden. Barnsley, South Yorkshire, UK: Pen & Sword, 2005. ISBN 1-84415-279-0
- Clausewitz, Carl von (2020). Napoleon Absent, Coalition Ascendant: The 1799 Campaign in Italy and Switzerland, Volume 1. Trans and ed. Nicholas Murray and Christopher Pringle. Lawrence, Kansas: University Press of Kansas. ISBN 978-0-7006-3025-7
- Clausewitz, Carl von (2021). The Coalition Crumbles, Napoleon Returns: The 1799 Campaign in Italy and Switzerland, Volume 2. Trans and ed. Nicholas Murray and Christopher Pringle. Lawrence, Kansas: University Press of Kansas. ISBN 978-0-7006-3034-9
- Rickard, J. (2009). "Combat of Uckerath, 19 June 1796". historyofwar.org.
- Smith, Digby. The Napoleonic Wars Data Book. London: Greenhill, 1998. ISBN 1-85367-276-9
- Smith, Digby. Paul Kray, Kray
