= Stockach =

- Town
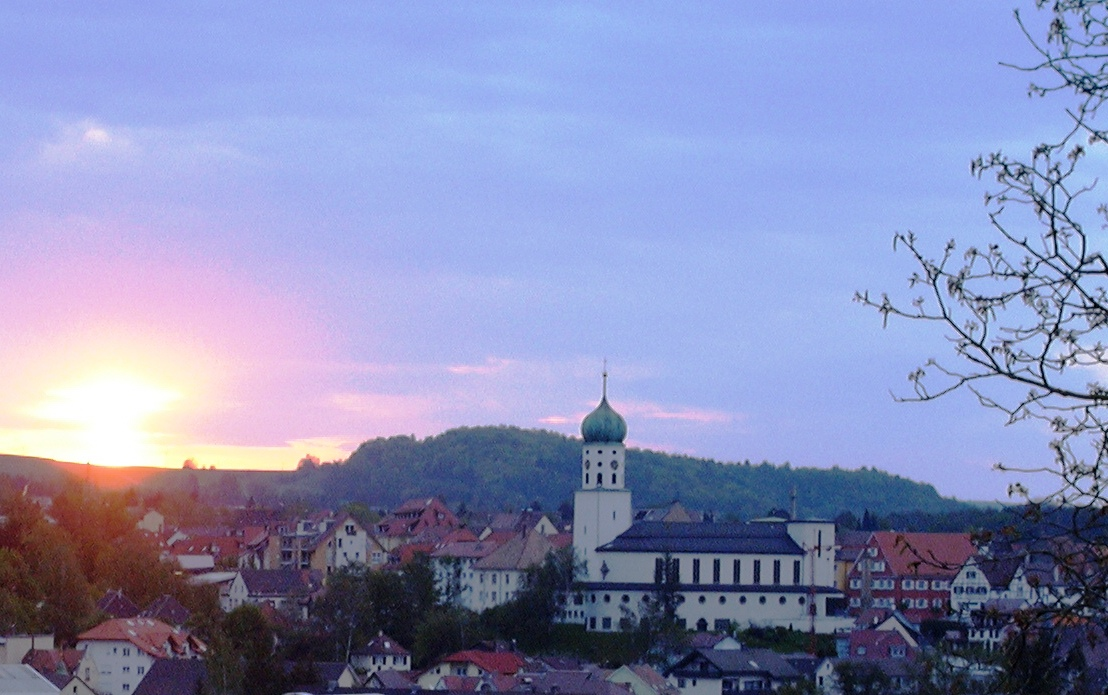

- Coat of arms

- Location of Stockach within Konstanz district
- Interactive map of Stockach
- Location within Germany Location within Baden-Württemberg
- Coordinates: 47°51′5″N 9°0′41″E
- Country: Germany
- State: Baden-Württemberg
- Admin. region: Freiburg
- District: Konstanz
- Subdivisions: 10

Government
  - Mayor (2023–31): Susen Katter

Area
  - Total: 69.73 km^{2} (26.92 sq mi)
- Elevation: 491 m (1,611 ft)

Population (2025-12-31)
  - Total: 17,547
  - Density: 251.6/km^{2} (651.7/sq mi)
- Time zone: UTC+01:00 (CET)
  - Summer (DST): UTC+02:00 (CEST)
- Postal codes: 78333
- Dialling codes: 07771
- Vehicle registration: KN
- Website: www.stockach.de

Stockach (German pronunciation: [ˈʃtɔkax]) is a town in the district of Konstanz, in southern Baden-Württemberg, Germany.

== Location ==
It is situated in the Hegau region, about 5 km northwest of Lake Constance, 13 km north of Radolfzell and 25 km northwest of Konstanz.

Stockach includes the central city and 10 villages:

- Espasingen
- Hindelwangen
- Hoppetenzell
- Mahlspüren im Hegau
- Mahlspüren im Tal
- Seelfingen
- Raithaslach
- Wahlwies
- Winterspüren
- Zizenhausen

== History ==
Arms of the Counts of Nellenburg (extinct 1422)

The Counts of Nellenburg founded Stockach in the 13th century, the town receiving town privileges in 1283. In 1401 to the Landgraviate of Nellenburg owned the towns of Engen, Tengen, Radolfzell, Stockach, 125 villages, 9 abbeys and 4 mailing stations.

The Counts of Nellenburg became extinct in 1422 and their estates were acquired by the House of Habsburg in 1465; hence Stockach was a part of Further Austria until 1805. In the Swabian War of 1499 the troops of the Three Leagues besieged the town but failed to capture it.

During the War of the Spanish Succession, Elector Maximilian II Emanuel of Bavaria set fire to Stockach. During the French Revolutionary Wars of the Second Coalition two battles were fought here between the French First Republic and the Habsburg monarchy in 1799 and 1800. In 1810 Stockach finally fell to the Grand Duchy of Baden.

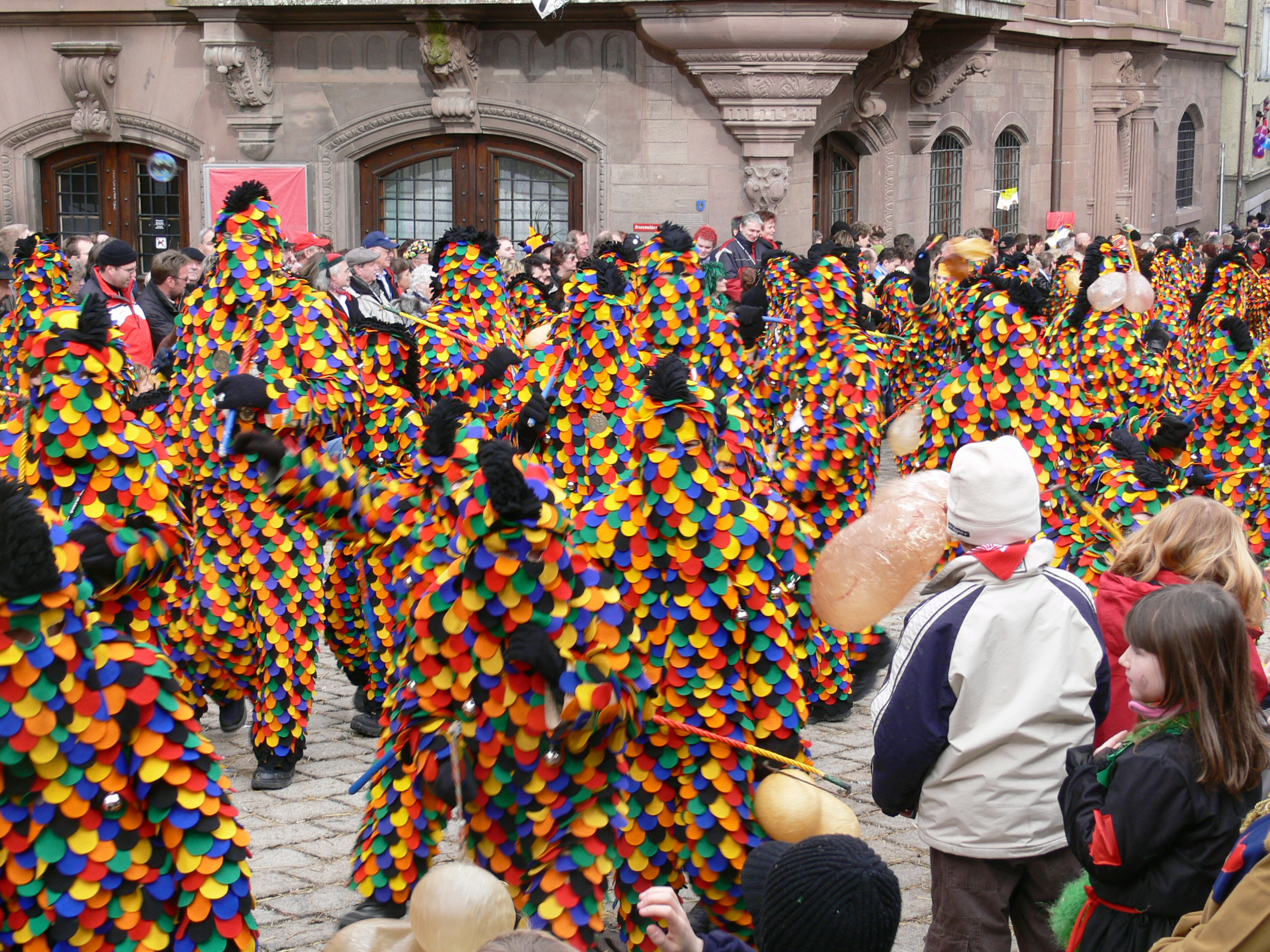
Court of fools in Stockach

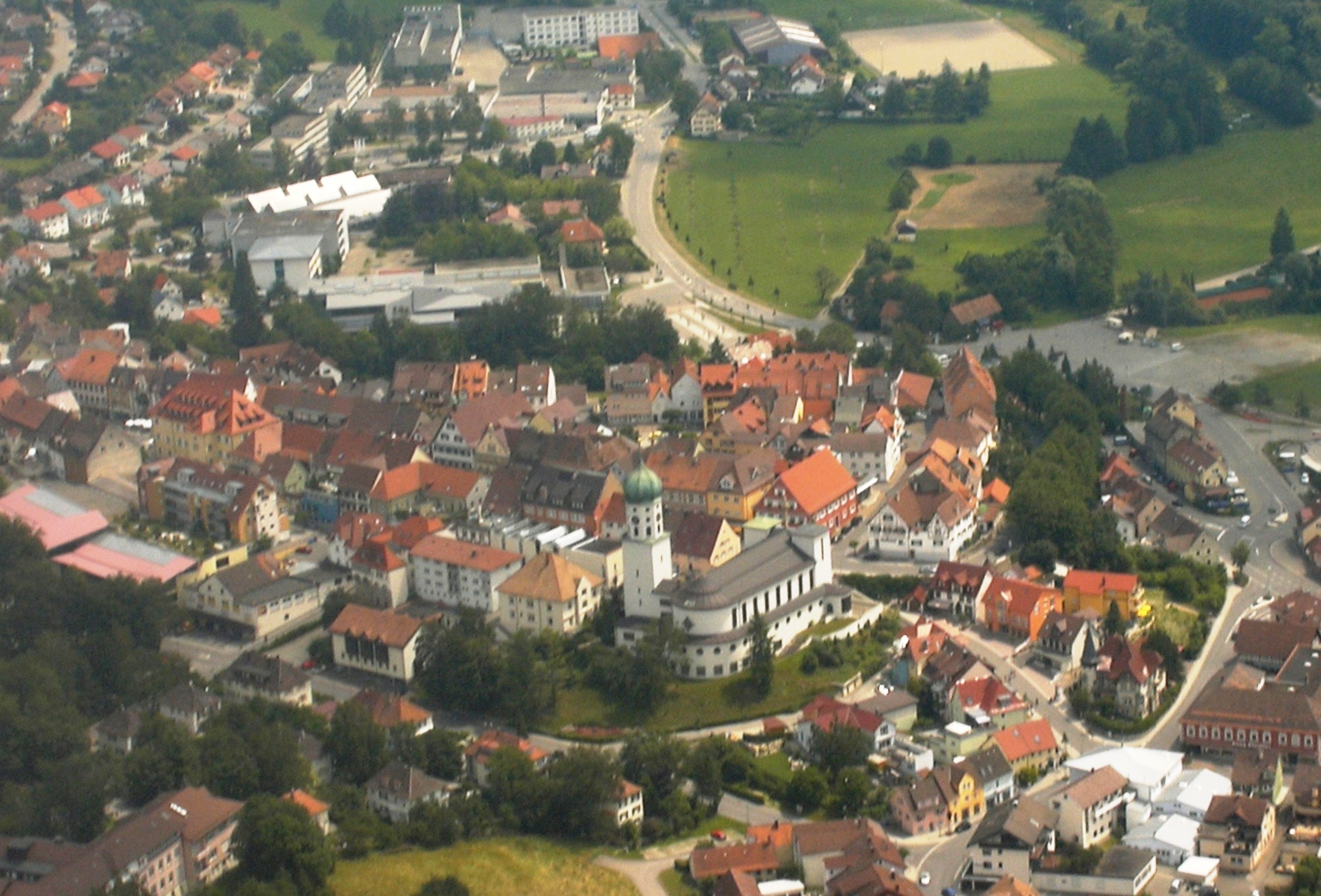
Aerial view

== Politics ==
=== Parties in the Ratshaus ===
| Party | Percentage | Seats | Ref. |
|---|---|---|---|
| Christian Democratic Union | 34.30% | 11 | |
| Free Voters | 33.38 | 10 | |
| Social Democratic Party | 15.89 | 5 | |
| Green Party | 9.40 | 3 | |
| Free Democratic Party | 7.03 | 2 | |

== Twin towns ==
Stockach is twinned with:

- La Roche-sur-Foron, France, since 1972

== Notable personalities ==
- Rudolf von Buol-Berenberg (1842–1902), German politician, president of German Reichstag (German Empire)
- 1993 Franz Ziwey (born 1932), 24 years mayor of Stockach
- Marc Dumitru (born 1986), actor and performer in House of Anubis
