= Claude-Sylvestre Colaud =

French Napoleonic general and senator

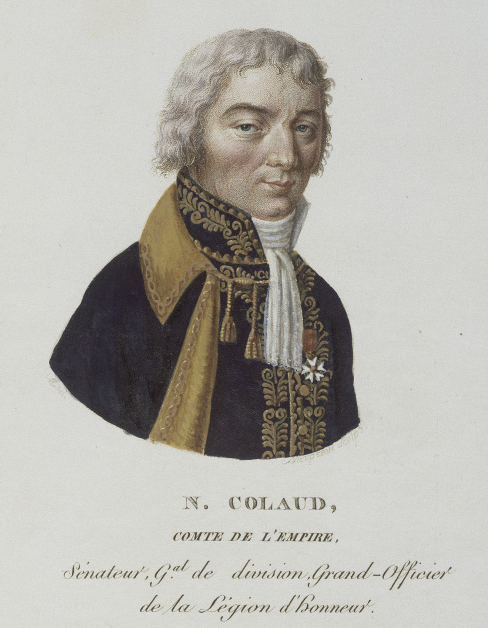
Claude Silvestre, Count Colaud.

Claude Silvestre, Count Colaud (12 December 1754 – 4 December 1819) was a French Napoleonic general and senator.

== Biography ==
Colaud was born at Briançon on 12 December 1754. In 1801, for his military services, he was made a senator of the French Consulate by the First Consul Napoleon Bonaparte. He was also made a Grand Officer of the Legion of Honour. He died in Paris on 4 December 1819. His name is inscribed on column five northern pillar of the Arc de Triomphe.

== Bibliography ==
- Jensen, Nathan D. (2013), General Claude-Sylvestre Colaud, arcdetriomphe.info
- Six, Georges (1934). "Colaud (Claude-Sylvestre, comte)". Dictionnaire biographique des généraux et amiraux français de la Révolution et de l'Empire: 1792–1814 (in French). Vol. 1. Paris: Librairie Historique et Nobilaire. p. 250.
- Thomas, Joseph (1892), Universal pronouncing dictionary of biography and mythology (Aa, van der – Hyperius), vol. 1, Philadelphia: J.B. Lippincott, p. 634
