= Gilles Joseph Martin Bruneteau =

French general (1760–1830)

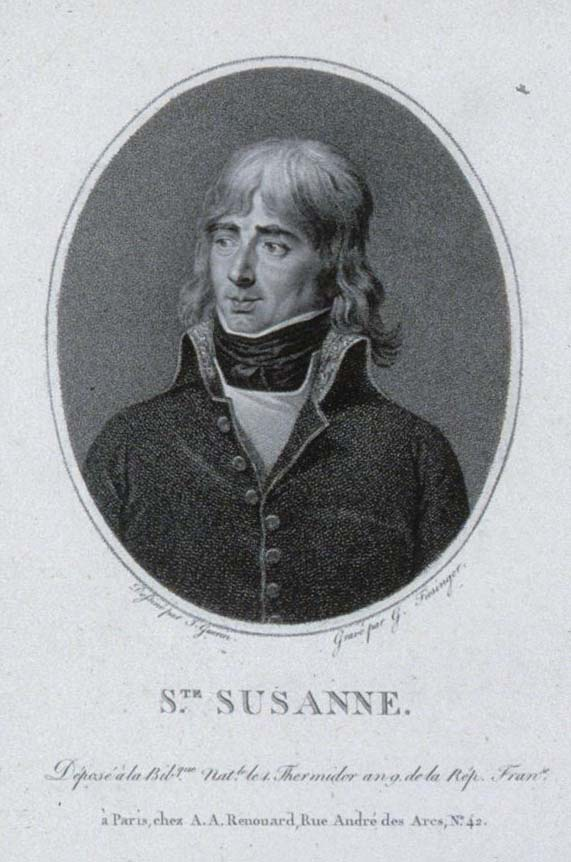
Gilbert De Bruneteau.

Gilles-Joseph-Martin Bruneteau, comte de Saint-Suzanne (pronounced [ʒil ʒozɛf maʁtɛ̃ bʁynto sɛ̃ syzan]; 7 March 1760 – 26 August 1830) was a French Revolutionary and Napoleonic general. A Grand Officer of the Legion of Honour, he was made a Count under the First French Empire.

His name is inscribed "S^{te} SUZANNE" on the east pillar of the Arc de Triomphe.
