= Wielhorski =

Wielhorski is a Polish surname. Notable people with the surname include:

- Józef Wielhorski (1759 – 1817), Polish general
- Józef Wielhorski (composer) (1816/1817 – 1892), Polish composer
- Michał Wielhorski (elder) (1730 – 1794), Polish noble
- Michał Wielhorski (younger) (1755 – 1805), Polish noble
- Mikhail Vielgorsky (1787 – 1856), Russian official and composer
