= Battle of Hohenlinden order of battle =

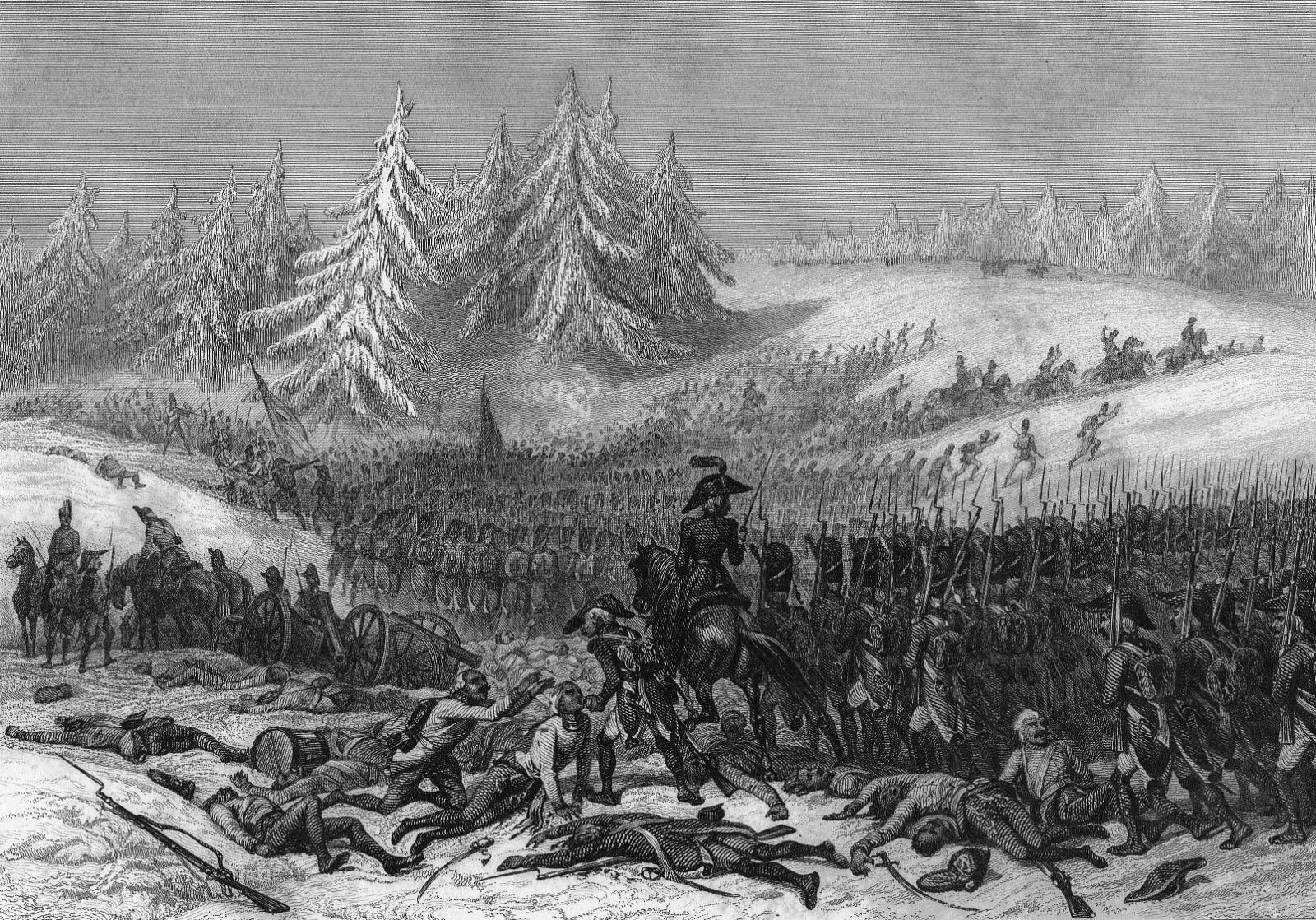
Battle of Hohenlinden, the march of Richepanse's division

In the Battle of Hohenlinden on 3 December 1800, a French army commanded by Jean Victor Marie Moreau decisively defeated the army of Habsburg monarchy led by Archduke John. The first action of the campaign was the Battle of Ampfing, two days earlier. After Hohenlinden there was a series of rearguard clashes beginning on 9 December at Rosenheim and continuing from the 14th through the 20th at Salzburg, Neumarkt am Wallersee, Frankenmarkt, Schwanenstadt, Vöcklabruck, Lambach, and Kremsmünster. During the retreat, the Habsburg army began a process of disintegration and an armistice was concluded a few days later.

For an explanation of the types of forces, see Types of military forces in the Napoleonic Wars.

== Austrian-Bavarian Army ==
=== Organization ===
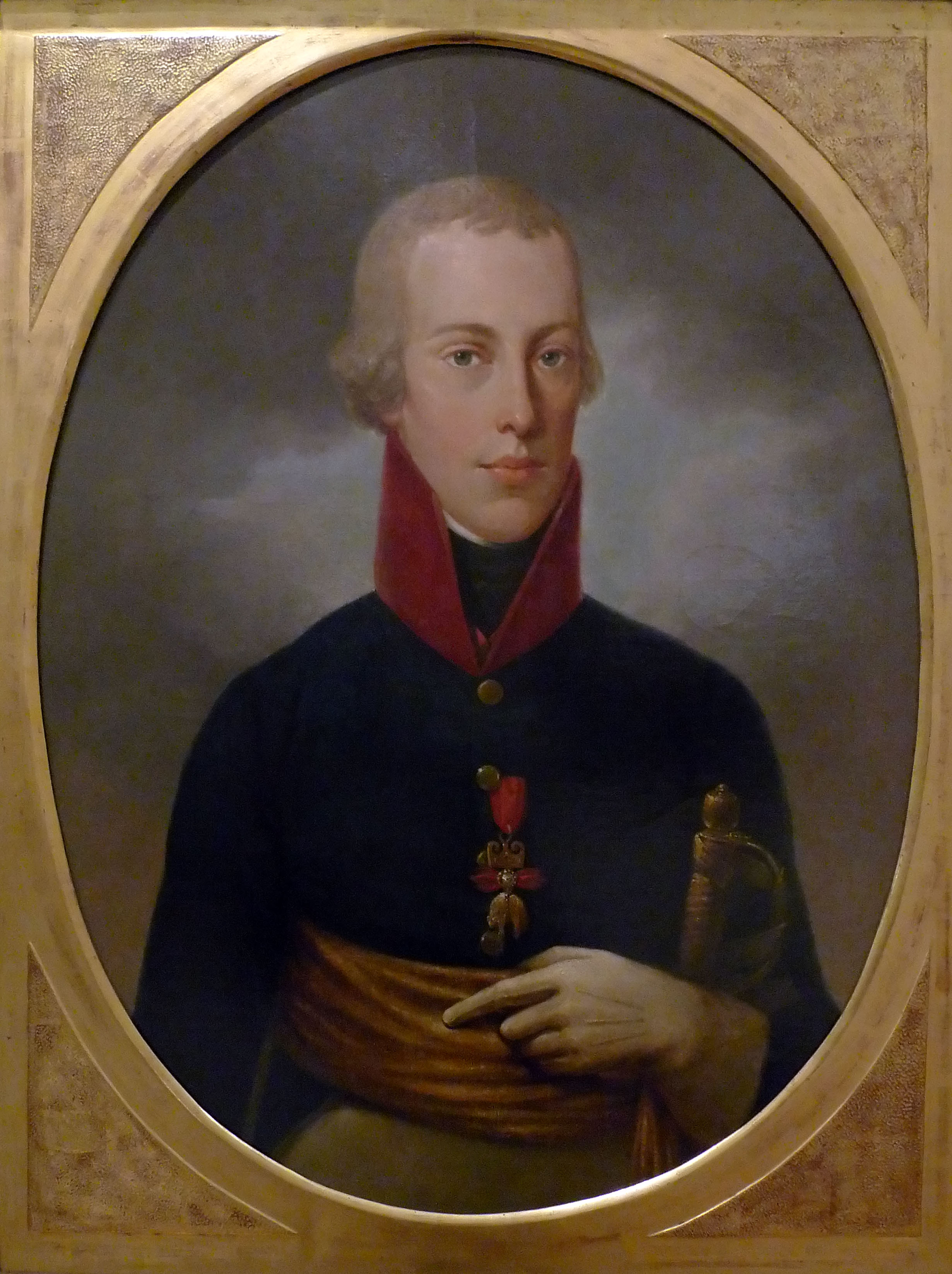
Archduke John of Austria

General-Major Archduke John of Austria (46,130 infantry, 14,131 cavalry, 3,724 other)
Deputy Commander: Feldzeugmeister Franz von Lauer
Chief-of-staff: Oberst Franz von Weyrother

==== Right Column ====
Feldmarschall-Leutnant Michael von Kienmayer (12,611 infantry, 3,370 cavalry)

- Artillery: 12 horse guns, 14 foot guns
- Division: Feldmarschall-Leutnant Karl Philipp, Prince of Schwarzenberg
  - Brigade: General-Major Johann Hennequin de Fresnel
    - Siegenburg-Wallachisch Grenz Infantry Regiment Nr. 1 (1 battalion)
    - Peterwardeiner Grenz Infantry Regiment Nr. 4 (1 battalion)
    - Coburg Dragoon Regiment Nr. 6 (6 squadrons)
    - Mack Cuirassier Regiment Nr. 10 (890 in 6 squadrons)
  - Brigade: General-Major Hieronymus Candiani
    - Archduke Ferdinand Karl Infantry Regiment Nr. 2 (2,696 in 3 battalions)
    - Württemberg Infantry Regiment Nr. 38 (1,590 in 2 battalions)
  - Brigade: General-Major Alois von Gavasini
    - Clerfayt Infantry Regiment Nr. 9 (2 battalions)
    - Gemmingen Infantry Regiment Nr. 21 (1,988 in 3 battalions)
    - De Ligne Infantry Regiment Nr. 30 (1 battalion)
    - Murray Infantry Regiment Nr. 55 (1,615 in 2 battalions)
    - Beaulieu Infantry Regiment Nr. 58 (2 battalions)
- Division: Feldmarschall-Leutnant Archduke Ferdinand Karl Joseph of Austria-Este
  - Brigade: Feldmarschall-Leutnant Archduke Ferdinand
    - Gradiscaner Grenz Infantry Regiment Nr. 1 (1 battalion)
    - Peterwardeiner Grenz Infantry Regiment Nr. 2 (1 battalion)
    - Wenkheim Infantry Regiment Nr. 35 (1,994 in 3 battalions)
    - Stain Infantry Regiment Nr. 50 (2,003 in 3 battalions)
  - Brigade: General-Major Karl von Vincent
    - vacant Dragoon Regiment Nr. 13 (6 squadrons)
  - Brigade: General-Major Konrad Weeber
    - Kaiser Cuirassier Regiment Nr. 1 (910 in 6 squadrons)

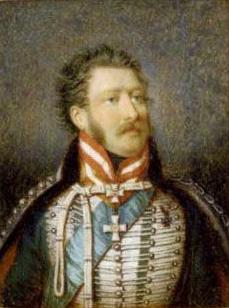
Friedrich Hessen-Homburg

==== Right Center Column ====
Feldmarschall-Leutnant Ludwig Anton, Count Baillet de Latour (8,346 infantry, 2,520 cavalry)

- Artillery: 12 horse guns, 14 foot guns
- Division: Feldmarschall-Leutnant Frederick VI, Landgrave of Hesse-Homburg
  - Brigade: General-Major Karl O'Donell von Tyrconell
    - Olivier Wallis Infantry Regiment Nr. 29 (2,108 in 3 battalions)
    - Lacy Infantry Regiment Nr. 22 (1,999 in 3 battalions)
  - Brigade: General-Major Karl Roszowski
    - Kronprinz Dragoon Regiment Nr. 2 (6 squadrons)
  - Brigade: General-Major Peter Dienersperg
    - Nassau Cuirassier Regiment Nr. 9 (6 squadrons)
- Division: Feldmarschall-Leutnant Prince Friedrich Karl Wilhelm of Hohenlohe-Ingelfingen
  - Brigade: General-Major David Majthany
    - Brechainville Infantry Regiment Nr. 25 (1,611 in 2 battalions)
    - DeVins Infantry Regiment Nr. 37 (792 in 1 battalion)
  - Brigade: General-Major Paul Esterházy
    - Latour Dragoon Regiment Nr. 11 (822 in 6 squadrons),
    - Zeschwitz Cuirassier Regiment Nr. 5 (801 in 6 squadrons)

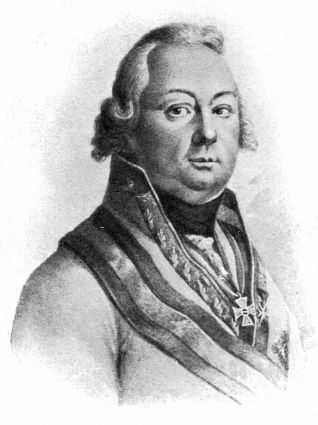
Johann Kollowrat

==== Left Center Column ====
Feldzeugmeister Johann Kollowrat (14,987 infantry, 5,109 cavalry)

- Avantgarde: General-Major Franz Löpper
  - General-Major Daniel Mécsery
    - Motschlitz Uhlan Regiment Nr. 2 (8 squadrons)
    - Mészáros Hussar Regiment Nr. 10 (8 squadrons)
    - Tyroler Schützen (10 companies)
    - Wurmser Freikorps (12 companies)
- Artillery: 12 horse guns, 14 foot guns
- Division: Feldmarschall-Leutnant Vincenz Maria Kolowrat-Liebsteinsky (Note: Kollowrat is listed as both column commander and division commander. Since Kollowrat-Krakowsky was appointed FZM on 28 October 1800, he was the highest-ranking column commander. The division commander may be either Johann Kollowrat or Kolowrat-Liebsteinsky, who was known to have served in the May to July 1800 campaign. Neither Arnold nor Smith are clear about the second Kollowrat.)
  - Brigade: General-Major Lelio Spannocchi
    - Sebottendorf Grenadier Battalion
    - Tegetthof Grenadier Battalion
    - Vouvermanns Grenadier Battalion
    - Eichler Grenadier Battalion
    - Infantry Regiment Nr. 60 (2,394 in 3 battalions)
  - Brigade: General-Major Joseph Beyer
    - Eggerdes Grenadier Battalion
    - DeLigne Grenadier Battalion
    - Papp Grenadier Battalion
    - Morwitz Grenadier Battalion
    - Benjowsky Infantry Regiment Nr. 31 (2,597 in 3 battalions)
- Bavarian Division: Feldmarschall-Leutnant Christian Zweibrücken (7,017 infantry, 828 cavalry)
  - Brigade: General-Major Bernhard Erasmus von Deroy
    - Metzen Light Battalion
    - Reuss Grenadier Battalion
    - Minucci Line Battalion
    - Stengel Line Battalion
    - Schlossberg Line Battalion
  - Brigade: General-Major Karl Philipp von Wrede
    - Pompei Line Battalion
    - Preysing Line Battalion
    - Bureck Line Battalion
    - Dallwigk Line Battalion
    - 2 companies of Light Infantry
  - Attached:
    - Uhlan Regiment (828 in 5-1/2 squadrons)
    - 8 horse guns
    - 18 foot guns
- Cavalry Division: Feldmarschall-Leutnant Johann I Joseph, Prince of Liechtenstein
  - Brigade: General-Major Christian Wolfskehl von Reichenberg
    - Vecsey Hussar Regiment Nr. 4 (1,189 in 8 squadrons)
    - Duke Albert Cuirassier Regiment Nr. 3 (6 squadrons)
    - Lorraine Cuirassier Regiment Nr. 7 (6 squadrons)
  - Brigade: General-Major Philipp Ferdinand von Grünne
    - Hohenzollern Cuirassier Regiment Nr. 8 (6 squadrons)
    - Archduke Ferdinand-Este Hussar Regiment Nr. 3 (1,205 in 6 squadrons)
    - Volunteer Hussars (898 in 4 squadrons)

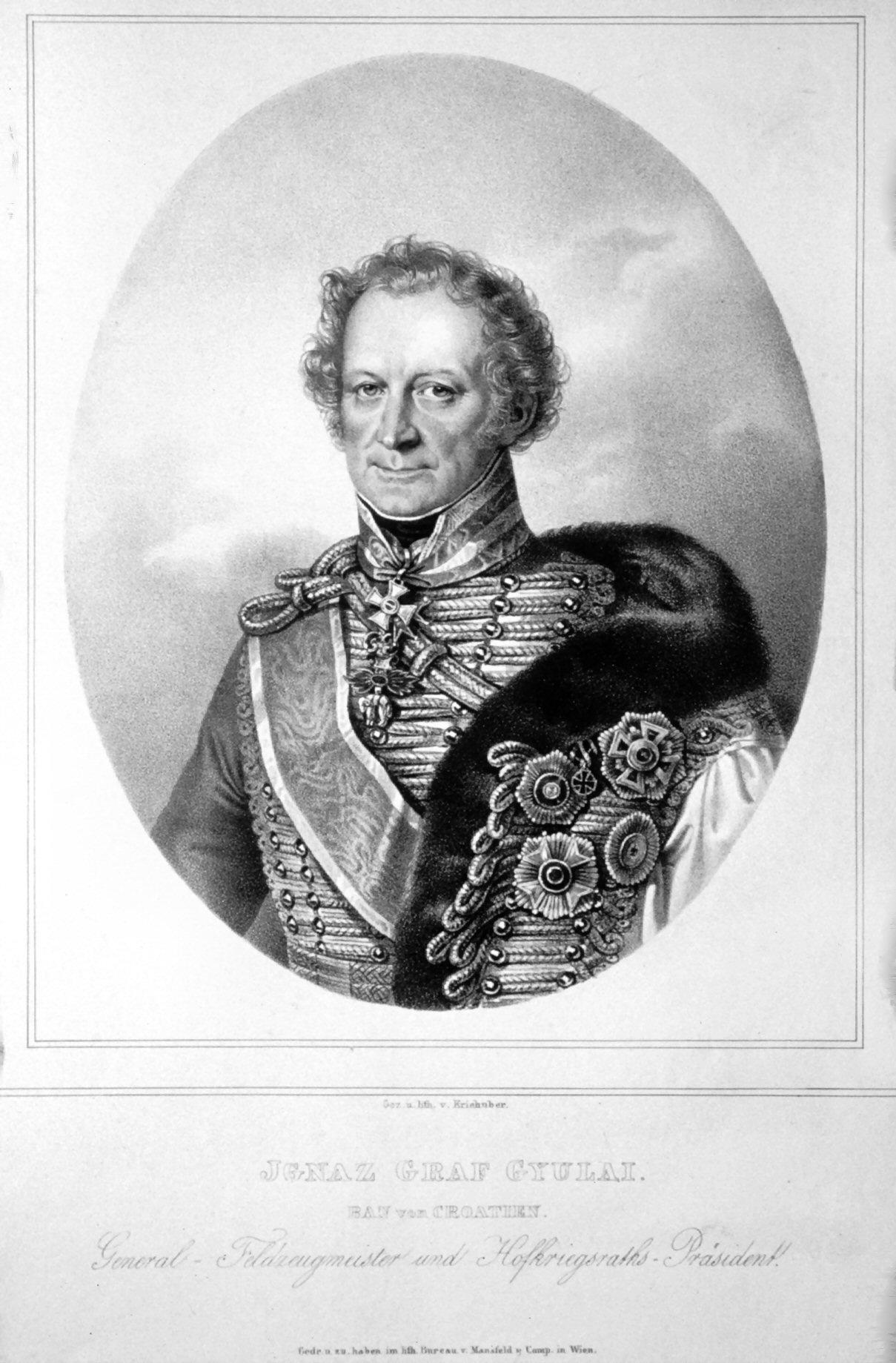
Ignaz Gyulai

==== Left Column ====
Feldmarschall-Leutnant Johann Sigismund Riesch (10,186 infantry, 3,132 cavalry)

- Artillery: 12 horse guns, 14 foot guns
- Division: Feldmarschall-Leutnant Maximilian, Count of Merveldt
  - Brigade: General-Major Joseph Klein
    - Wenzel Colloredo Infantry Regiment Nr. 56 (2,114 in 3 battalions)
    - Archduke Charles Infantry Regiment Nr. 3 (2,090 in 3 battalions)
  - Brigade: General-Major Philipp Görger
    - Waldeck Dragoon Regiment Nr. 7 (888 in 6 squadrons)
    - Anspach Cuirassier Regiment Nr. 11 (911 in 6 squadrons)
- Division: Feldmarschall-Leutnant Ignaz Gyulai
  - Brigade: General-Major Ernst Leuven
    - Manfreddini Infantry Regiment Nr. 12 (2,107 in 3 battalions)
    - Kaunitz Infantry Regiment Nr. 20 (2,105 in 3 battalions)
  - Brigade: General-Major Albert Stahel
    - Kinsky Dragoon Regiment Nr. 12 (478 in 6 squadrons)
    - Archduke Franz Cuirassier Regiment Nr. 2 (855 in 6 squadrons)

=== Generals ===
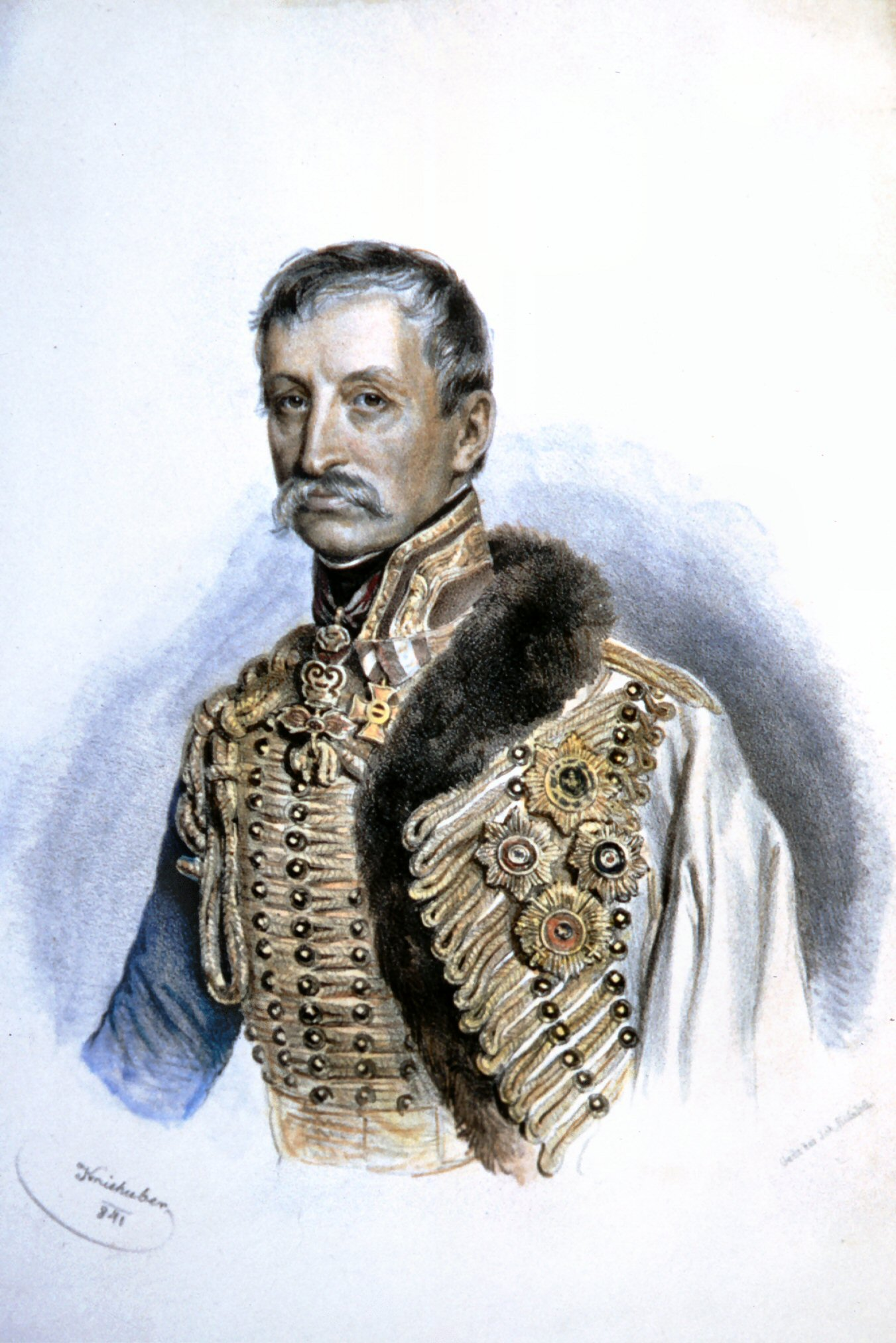
Archduke Ferdinand

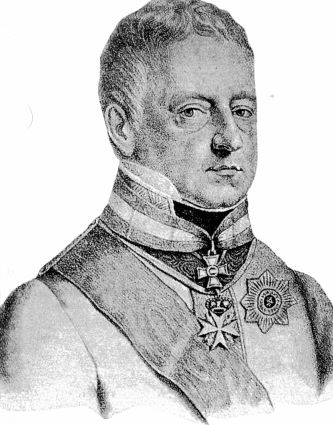
Michael Kienmayer

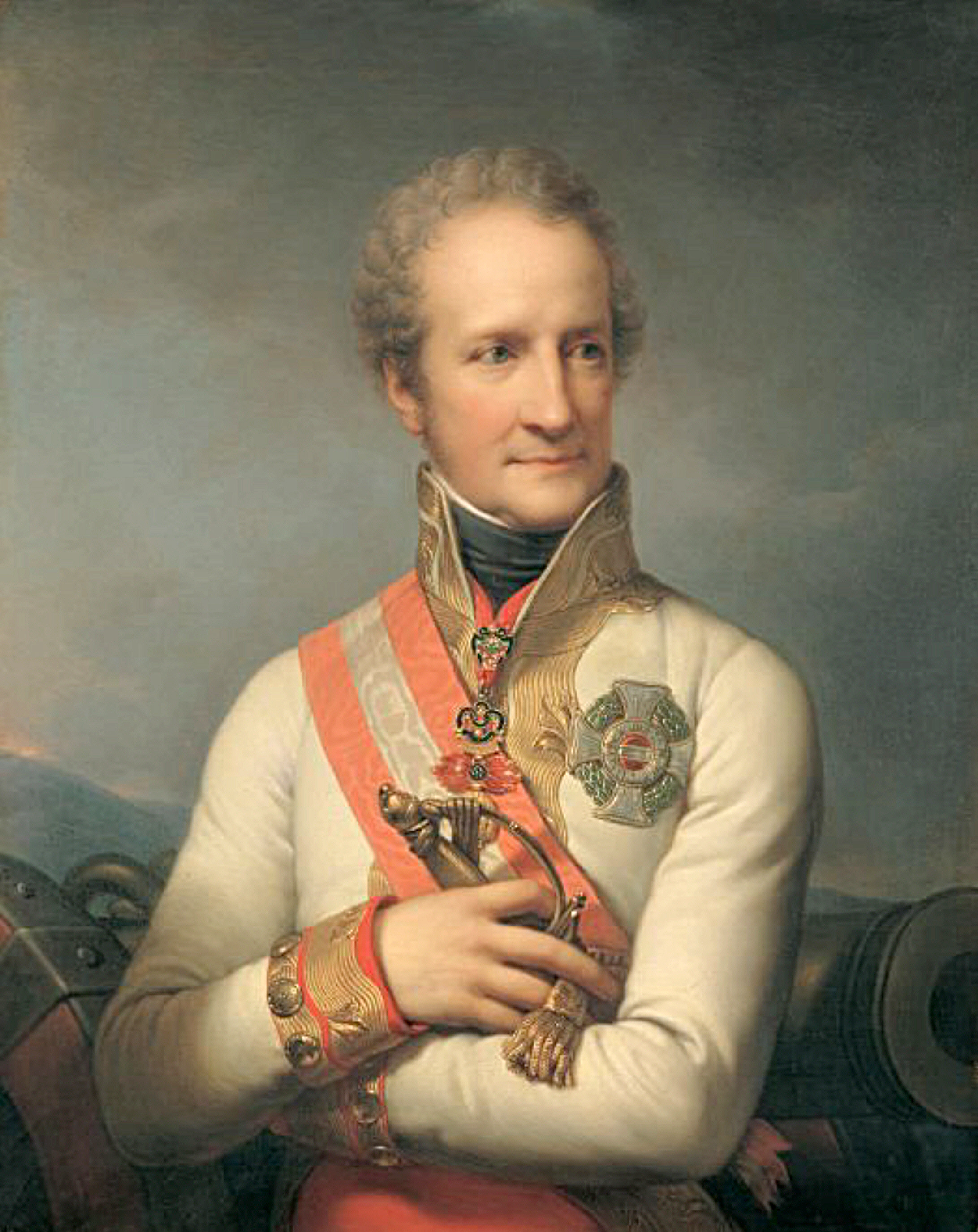
Johann Liechtenstein

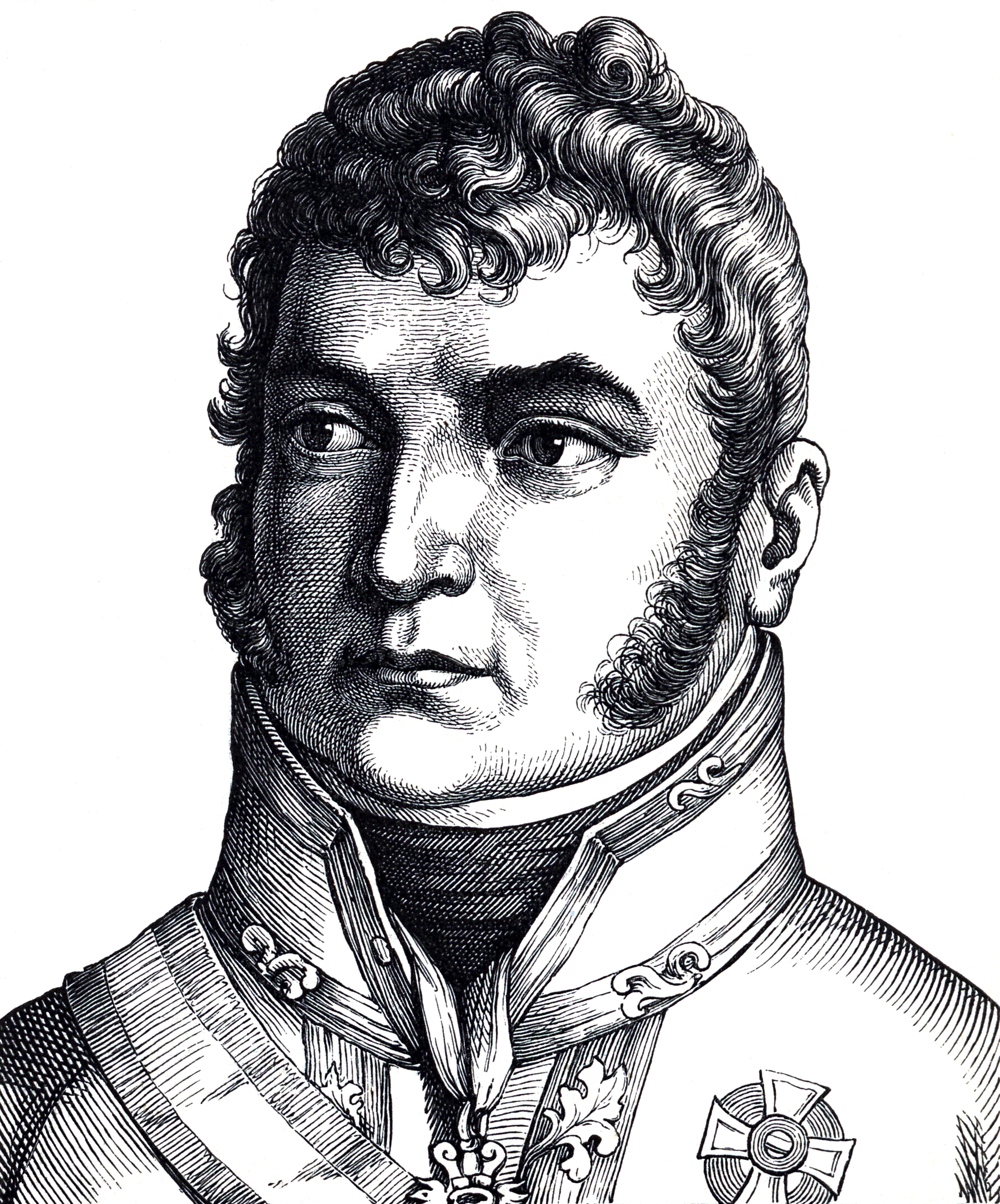
Karl Schwarzenberg

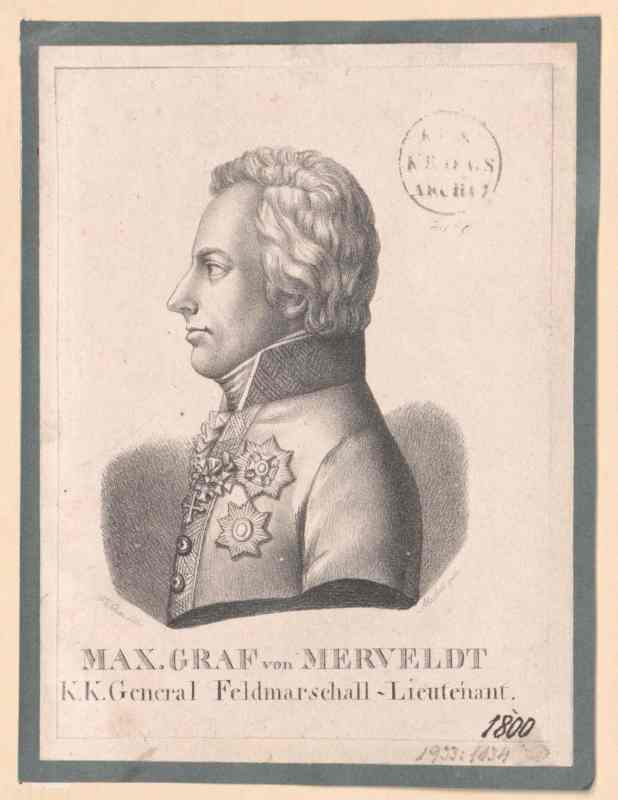
Maximilian Merverdt

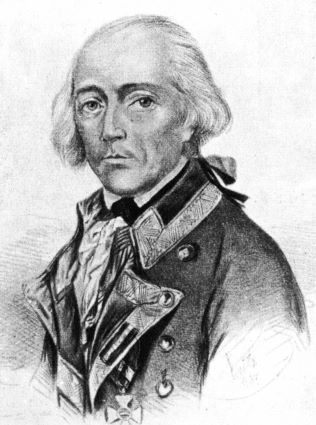
Franz von Lauer

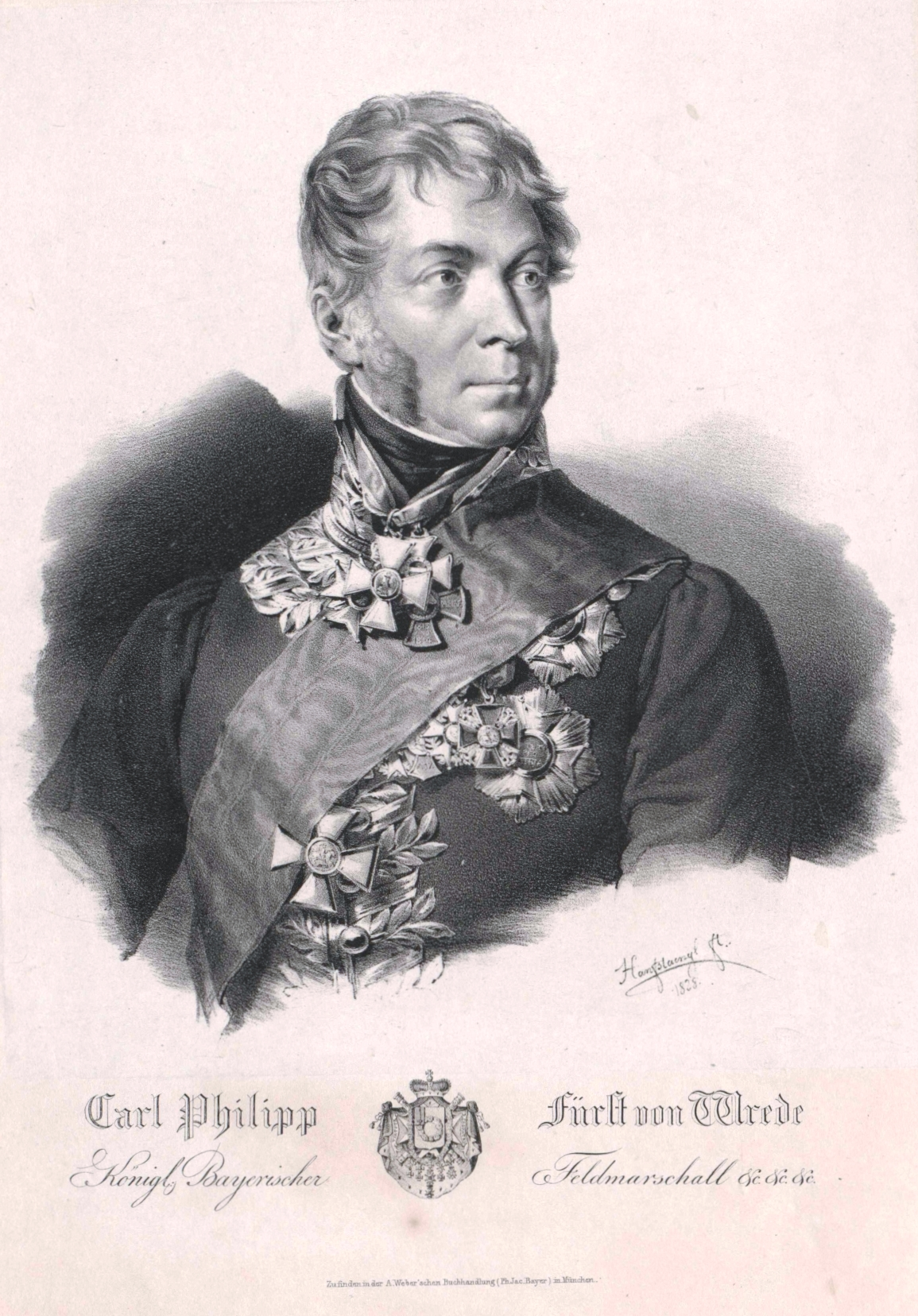
Karl von Wrede

== French Army ==
=== Organization ===
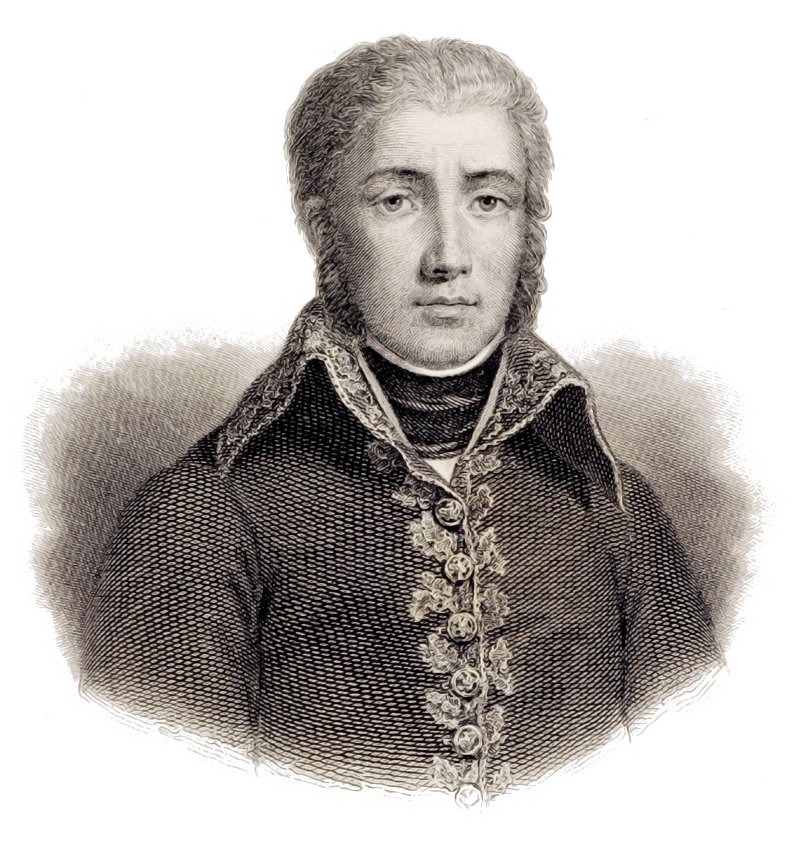
Jean Victor Moreau

General of Division Jean Victor Marie Moreau (41,990 infantry, 11,805 cavalry, 1,935 artillery, 99 guns)
Chief of Staff: General of Division Jean-Joseph Dessolles

==== Left Wing ====
General of Division Paul Grenier

- 1st Division: General of Division Claude Legrand (7,930, 12 guns)
  - Brigades: Generals of Brigade Charles Saligny de San-Germano, Juste Pasteur Sabatier, François Bontemps (Note: The brigadiers to whom the demi-brigades were assigned are not known.)
    - 16th Line Infantry Demi-Brigade (2,072)
    - 42nd Line Infantry Demi-Brigade (2,043)
    - 51st Line Infantry Demi-Brigade (2,118)
    - 12th Cavalry Regiment (316)
    - 5th Chasseurs à Cheval Regiment (574)
    - 16th Chasseurs à Cheval Regiment (516)
- 2nd Division: General of Division Michel Ney (9,630, 12 guns)
  - Brigades: Generals of Brigade Jean Pierre François Bonet, Gabriel Poissonnier Desperièrres, Dominique Joba
    - 15th Line Infantry Demi-Brigade (2,046)
    - 23rd Line Infantry Demi-Brigade (1,456)
    - 76th Line Infantry Demi-Brigade (2,337)
    - 103rd Line Infantry Demi-Brigade (1,643)
    - Converged Grenadiers (763)
    - 19th Cavalry Regiment (193)
    - 13th Dragoon Regiment (425)
    - 8th Chasseurs à Cheval Regiment (487)
- 3rd Division: General of Brigade Louis Bastoul, vice General of Division Jean Hardy, wounded (6,315, 16 guns)
  - Brigades: General of Brigade Jean Fauconnet
    - 53rd Line Infantry Demi-Brigade (2,007)
    - 89th Line Infantry Demi-Brigade (2,053)
    - 13th Cavalry Regiment (271)
    - 17th Cavalry Regiment (387)
    - 2nd Dragoon Regiment (686)
    - 23rd Chasseurs à Cheval Regiment (700)

==== Reserve ====
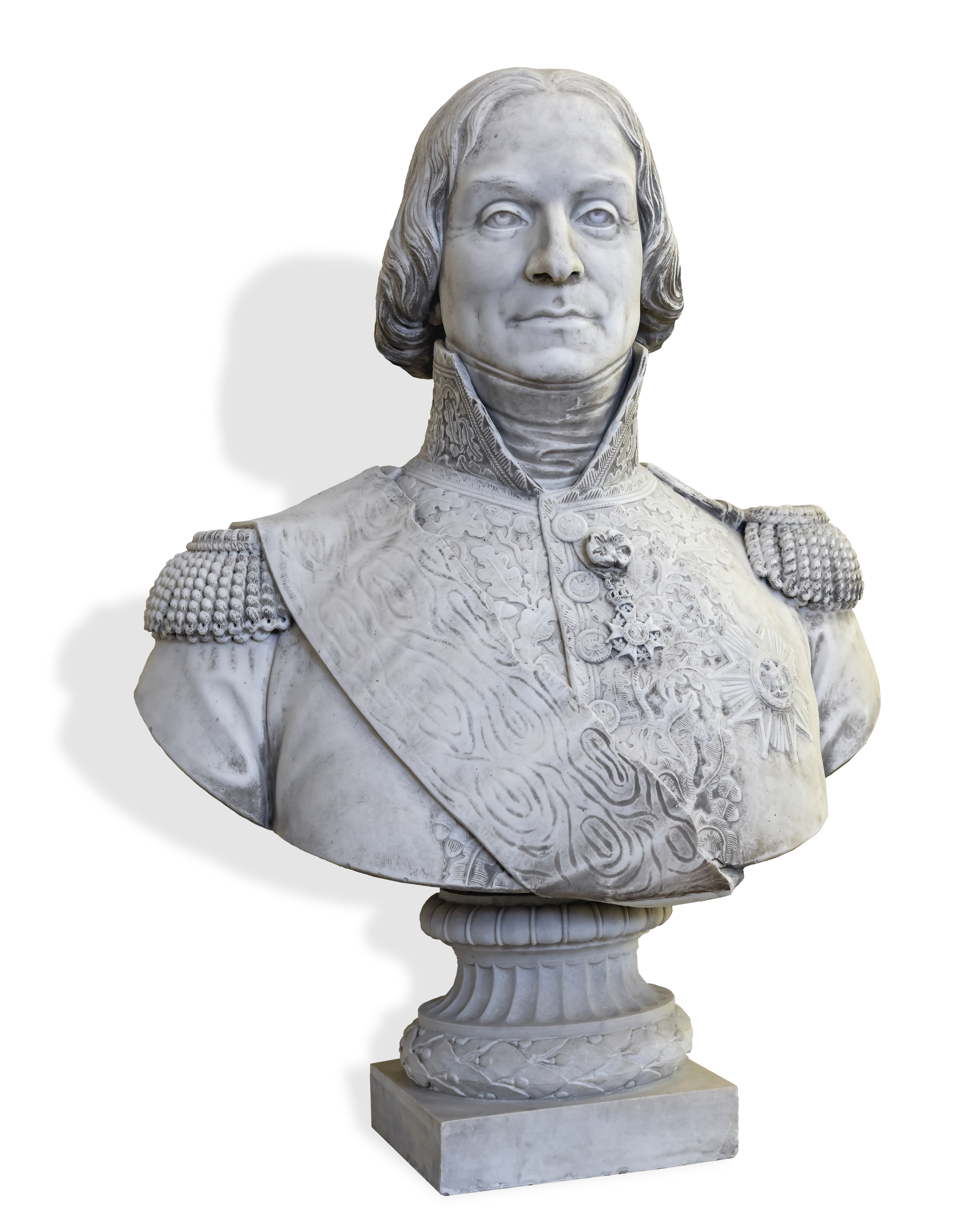
Jean d'Hautpoul

General of Division Jean Victor Moreau

- Artillery: General of Brigade Jean Baptiste Eblé (6 guns)
- Cavalry: General of Division Jean-Joseph Ange d'Hautpoul (1,738 cavalry, 6 guns)
  - Brigades: Generals of Brigade Jean-Louis-Brigitte Espagne, Jean Laurent Justin La Coste Duvivier
    - 1st Carabinier Regiment (391)
    - 2nd Carabinier Regiment (397)
    - 8th Cavalry Regiment (325)
    - 9th Cavalry Regiment (328)
    - Volunteer Hussars (137)
    - 1st company/3rd Horse Artillery Regiment

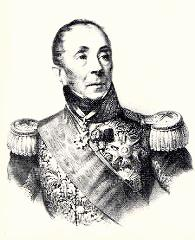
Emmanuel Grouchy

- 1st Division: General of Division Emmanuel Grouchy (8,615, 12 guns)
  - Brigades: Generals of Brigade Charles Louis Grandjean, Charles Boyé
    - 46th Line Infantry Demi-Brigade (2,298)
    - 57th Line Infantry Demi-Brigade (2,353)
    - 108th Line Infantry Demi-Brigade (2,234)
    - 6th Cavalry Regiment (272)
    - 11th Chasseurs à Cheval Regiment (500)
    - 4th Hussar Regiment (627)
    - 1st company/3rd Artillery Regiment
    - 5th company/3rd Sapper Battalion
- 2nd Division: General of Division Antoine Richepanse (10,735, 14 guns)
  - Brigades: Generals of Brigade Frédéric Henri Walther, Jean-Baptiste Drouet, Jean-Baptiste Lorcet, Louis Michel Antoine Sahuc
    - 8th Line Infantry Demi-Brigade (2,680)
    - 27th Line Infantry Demi-Brigade (2,438)
    - 48th Line Infantry Demi-Brigade (2,192)
    - 1st battalion/14th Light Infantry Demi-Brigade (849)
    - 10th Cavalry Regiment (300)
    - 1st Chasseurs à Cheval Regiment (610)
    - 20th Chasseurs à Cheval Regiment (698)
    - 5th Hussar Regiment (596)
    - 4th company/3rd Horse Artillery Regiment
    - 6th company/3rd Horse Artillery Regiment
    - 20th company/2nd Artillery Regiment
    - 7th company/4th Sapper Battalion

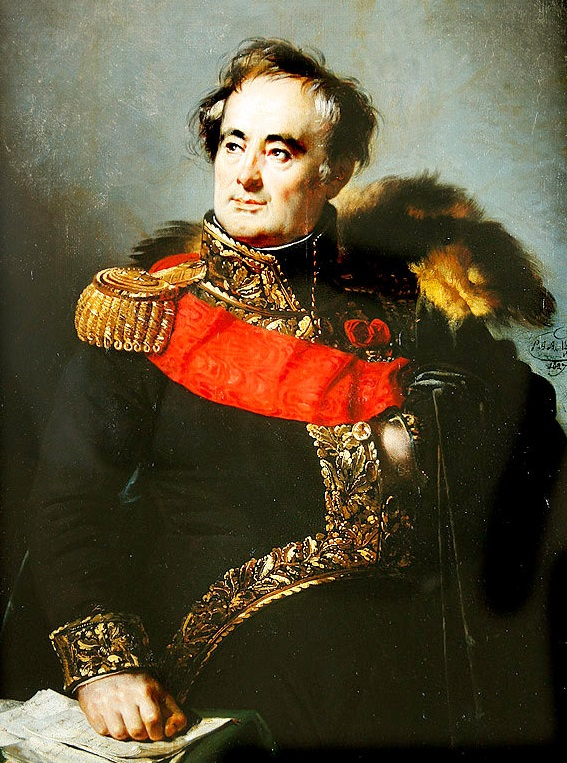
Charles Mathieu Isidore Decaen

- 3rd Division: General of Division Charles Mathieu Isidore Decaen (10,161, 12 guns)
  - Brigades: Generals of Brigade Jean Louis Debilly, Pierre François Joseph Durutte, Karol Kniaziewicz
    - 4th Line Infantry Demi-Brigade (2,000)
    - 100th Line Infantry Demi-Brigade (1,992)
    - 2nd and 3rd battalions/14th Light Infantry Demi-Brigade (1,451)
    - Polish Danube Legion (2,312)
    - 17th Dragoon Regiment (442)
    - 6th Chasseurs à Cheval (665)
    - 10th Chasseurs à Cheval (562)
    - Polish Lancers (400)
    - 2nd company/3rd Horse Artillery Regiment
    - 3rd company/5th Artillery Regiment
    - Polish Artillery
    - 1st company/4th Sapper Battalion

==== Right Wing ====
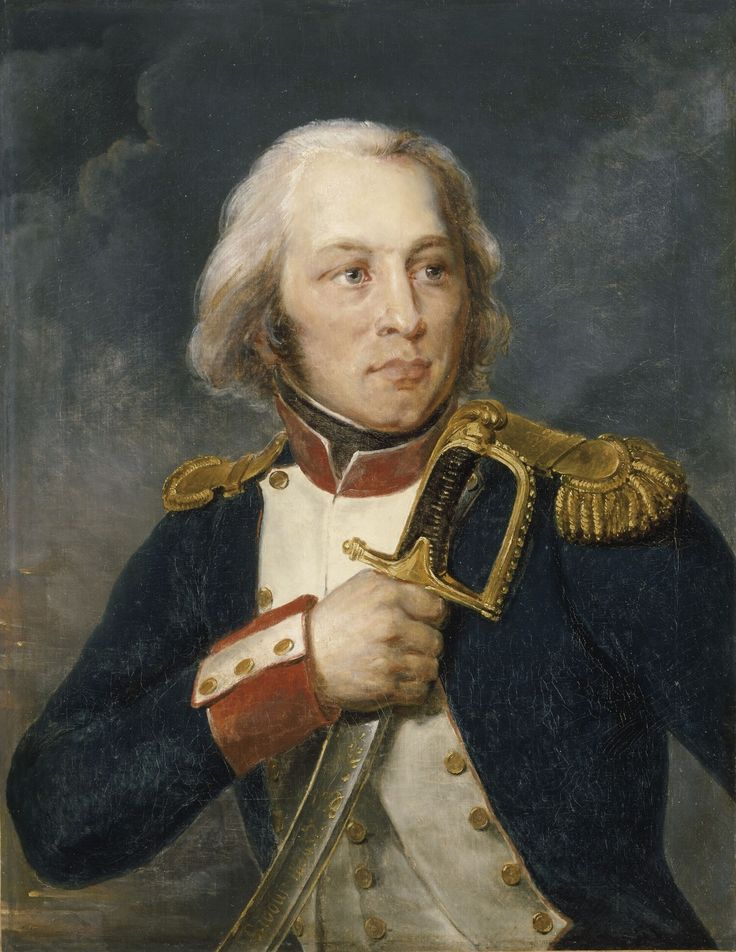
Claude Lecourbe

'General of Division Claude Lecourbe (19,663 infantry, 2,915 cavalry, 36 guns) (Note: Lecourbe's wing was not engaged at Hohenlinden, but participated in the later clashes.)

- 1st Division: General of Division Gabriel Jean Joseph Molitor (5,240 infantry, 1,016 cavalry, 11 guns)
  - Brigade: General of Brigade Henri Jardon
    - 1st Light Infantry Demi-Brigade (1 battalion)
    - 10th Light Infantry Demi-Brigade (2 battalions)
    - 83rd Line Infantry Demi-Brigade (3 battalions)
    - 6th Hussar Regiment (3 squadrons)
    - 7th Hussar Regiment (4 squadrons)
- 2nd Division: General of Division Charles-Étienne Gudin de La Sablonnière (7,588 infantry, 605 cavalry, 9 guns)
  - Brigades: Generals of Brigade Anne-Gilbert Laval, Jacques-Pierre-Louis Puthod
    - 10th Light Infantry Demi-Brigade (1 battalion)
    - 36th Line Infantry Demi-Brigade (3 battalions)
    - 38th Line Infantry Demi-Brigade (3 battalions)
    - 94th Line Infantry Demi-Brigade (3 battalions)
    - 8th Hussar Regiment (4 squadrons)
- 3rd Division: General of Division Joseph Hélie Désiré Perruquet de Montrichard (6,835 infantry, 413 cavalry, 13 guns)
  - Brigades: Generals of Brigade Roussel, Joseph Schiner
    - 37th Line Infantry Demi-Brigade (3 battalions)
    - 84th Line Infantry Demi-Brigade (3 battalions)
    - 109th Line Infantry Demi-Brigade (3 battalions)
    - 9th Hussar Regiment (4 squadrons)
- Reserve Cavalry: General of Brigade Étienne Marie Antoine Champion de Nansouty (881 cavalry, 3 guns)
  - 11th Dragoon Regiment (4 squadrons)
  - 23rd Chasseurs à Cheval (4 squadrons)
- Artillery Park: (3 guns)

=== Generals ===
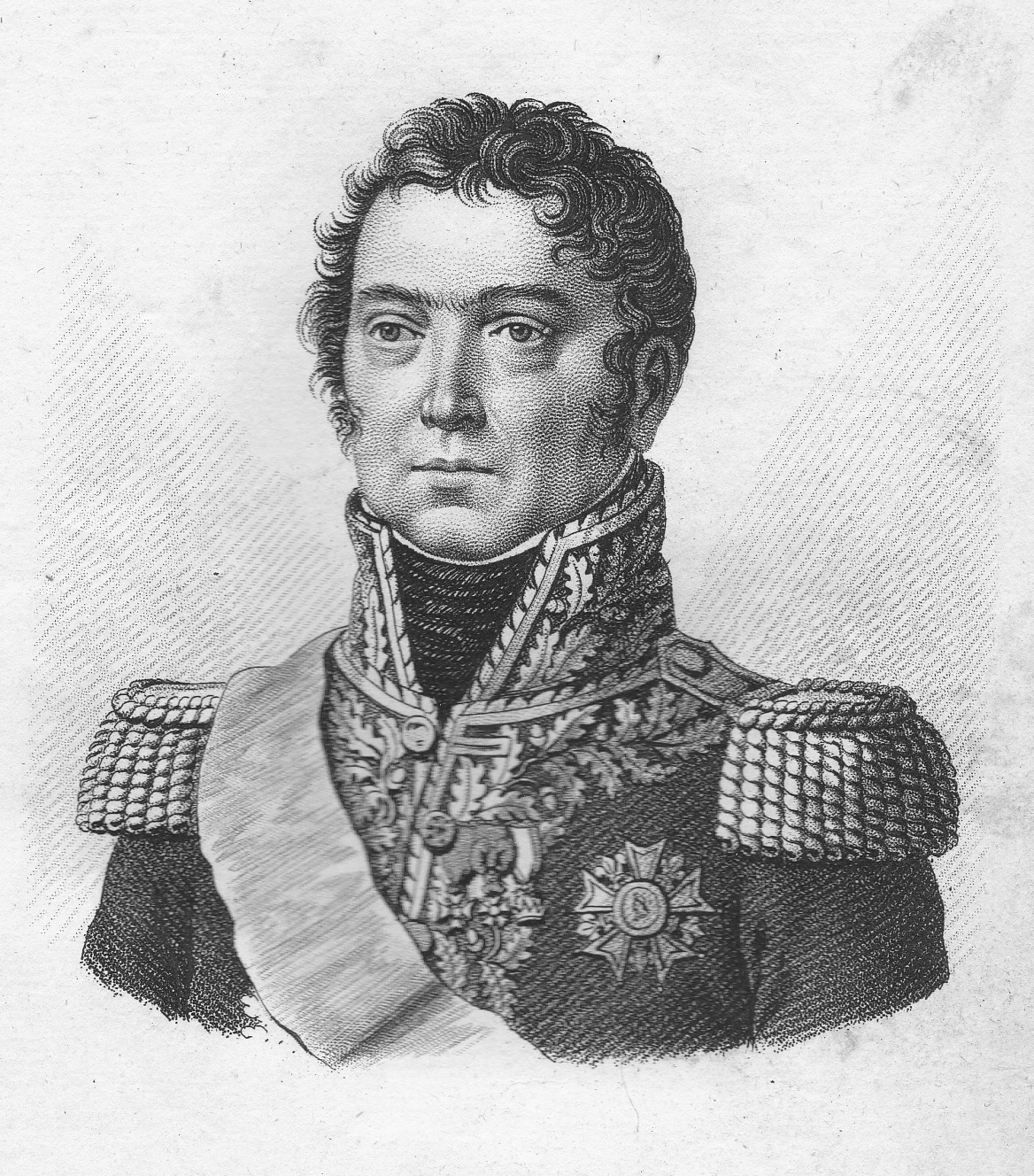
Paul Grenier

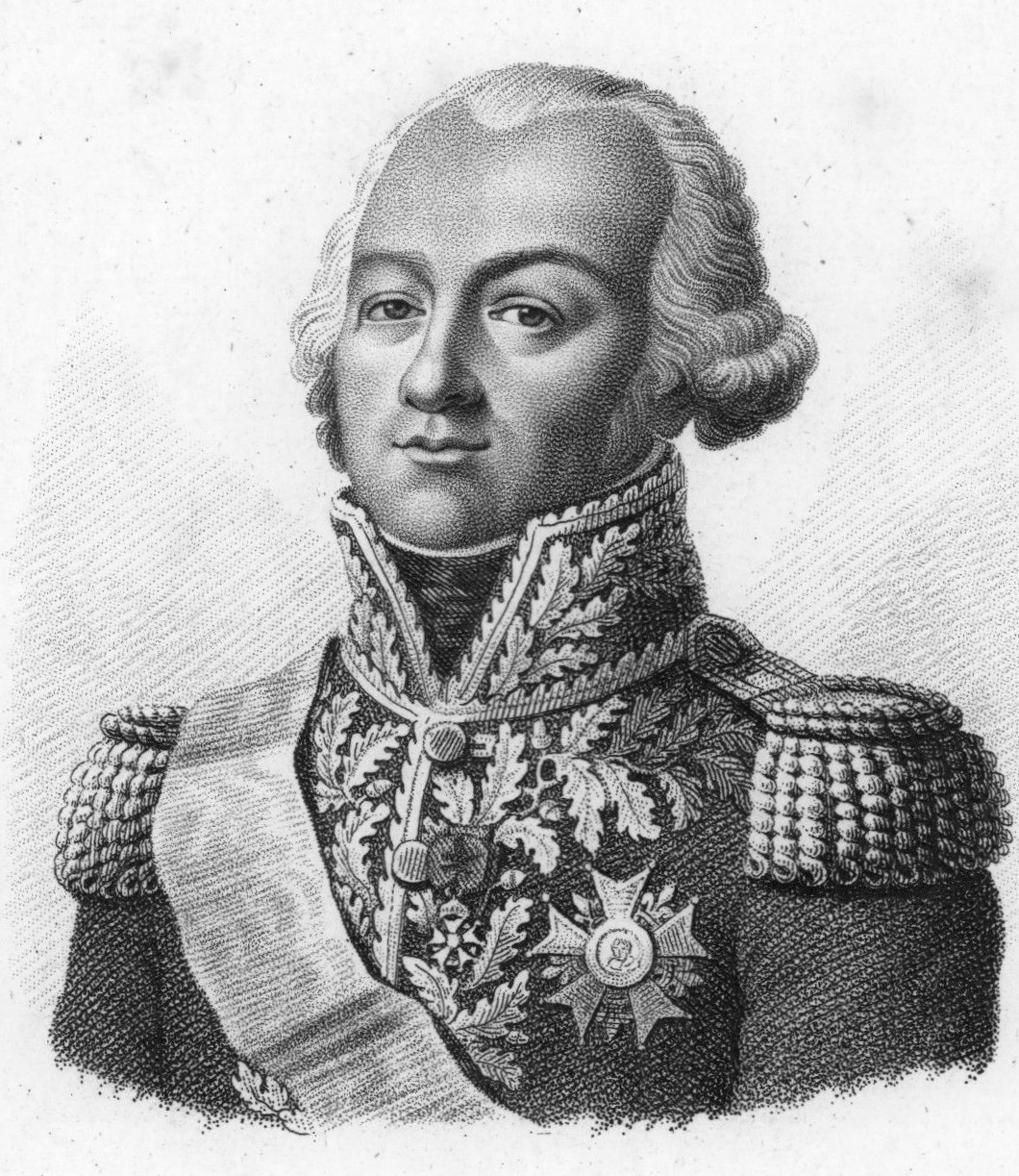
Claude Legrand

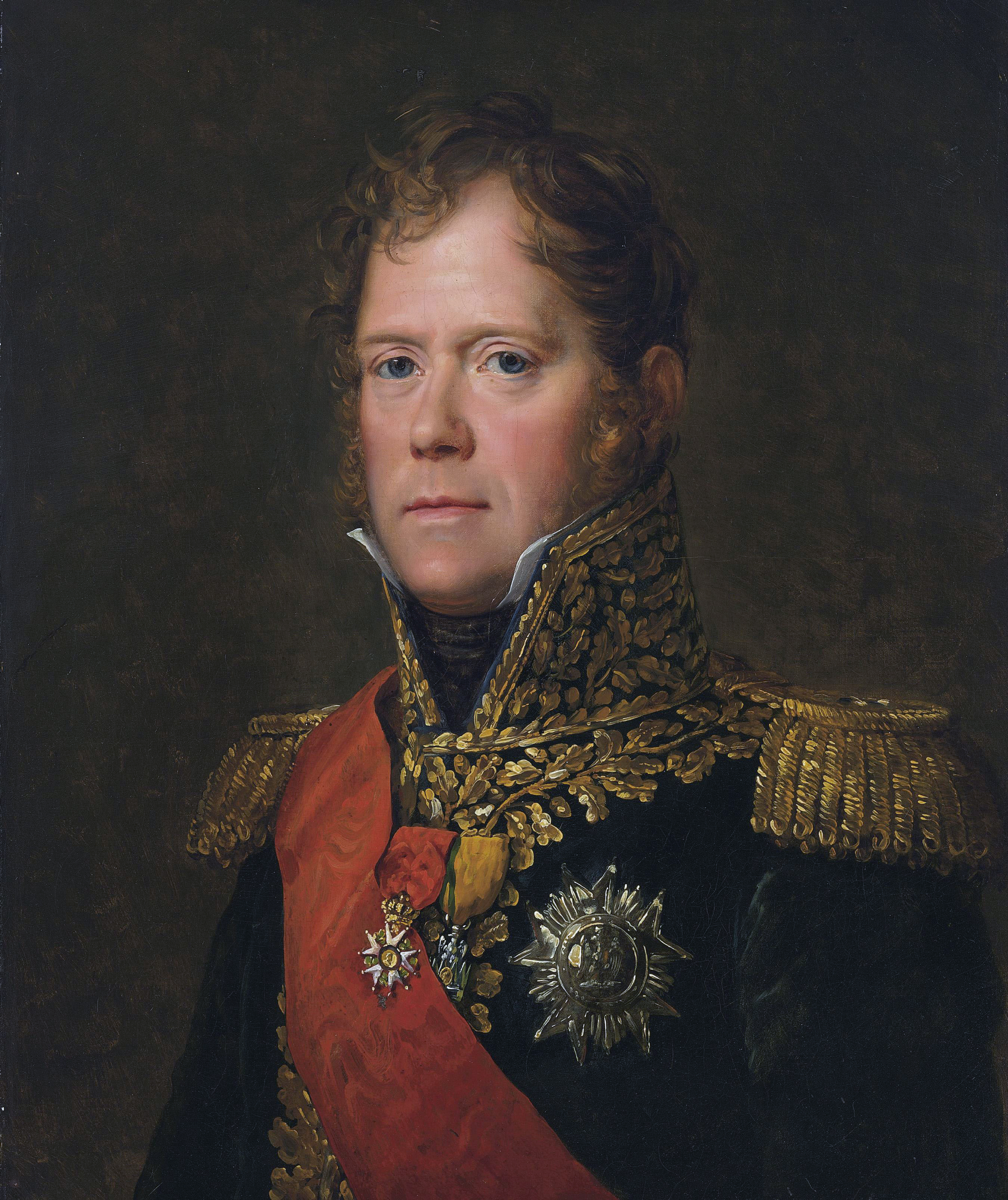
Michel Ney

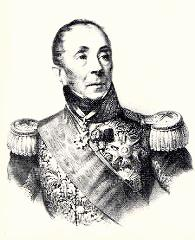
Emmanuel Grouchy

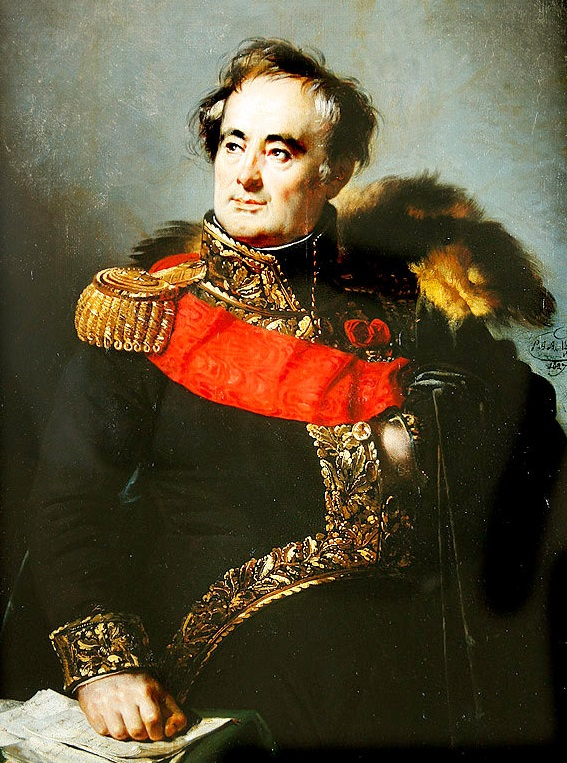
Charles Decaen

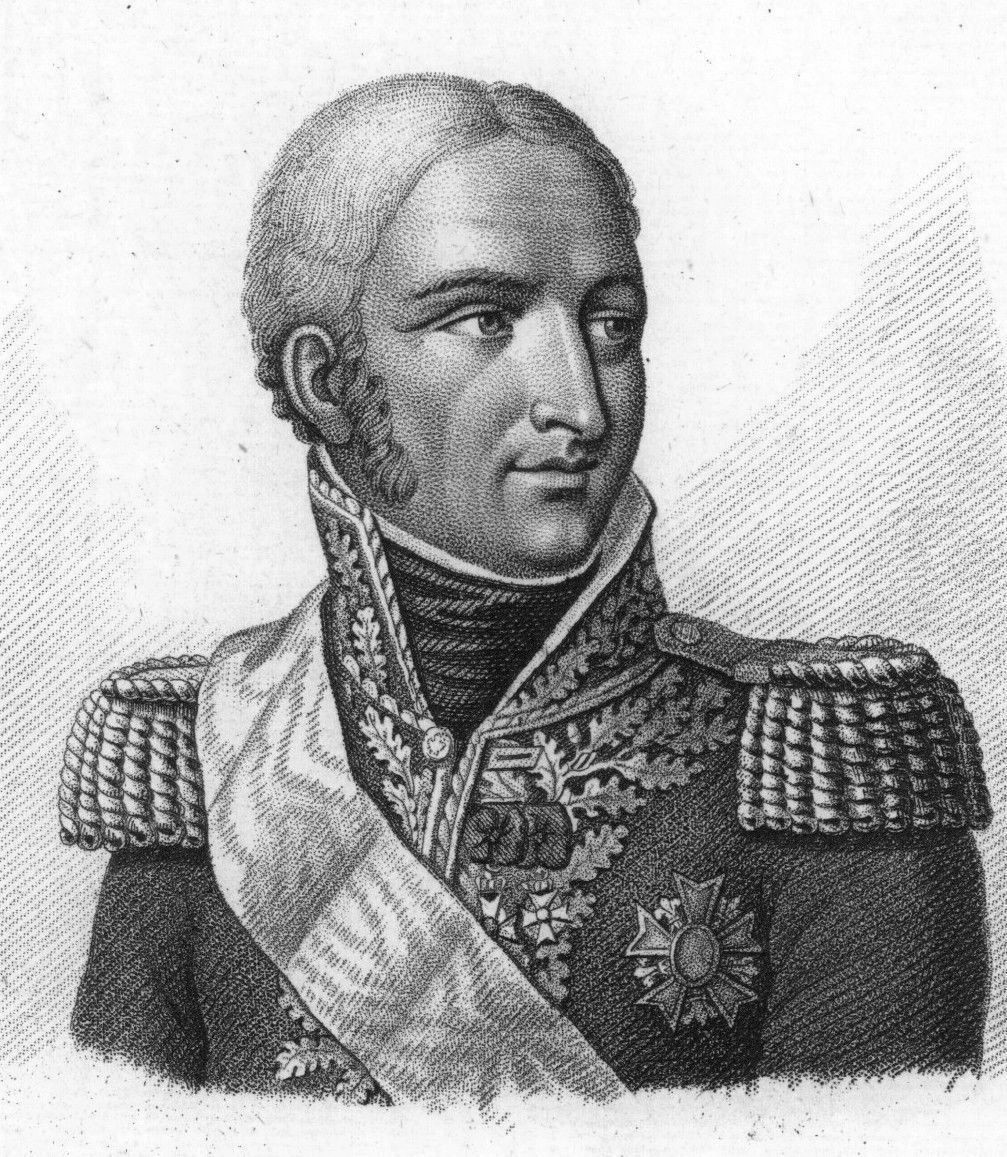
Jean Dessolles

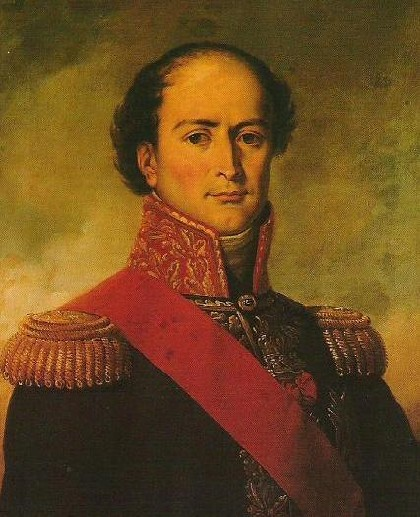
Jean Baptiste Eblé

== Notes ==
Footnotes

Citations
