= Siege of Mantua =

Siege of Mantua can refer to:

- Siege of Mantua (1630) (War of the Mantuan Succession, French defending)
- Siege of Mantua (1702) (War of the Spanish Succession, French defending)
- Siege of Mantua (1796–97) (First Coalition, French besieging)
- Siege of Mantua (1799) (Second Coalition, French defending)
