= Michał Wielhorski =

Michał Wielhorski may refer to:

- Michał Wielhorski (elder), 1730 – 1814
- Michał Wielhorski (younger), 1755–1805
- Michał Wielhorski (composer) (Mikhail Vielgorsky), 1787-1856
