= Józef Wielhorski =

Polish general of the Napoleonic era

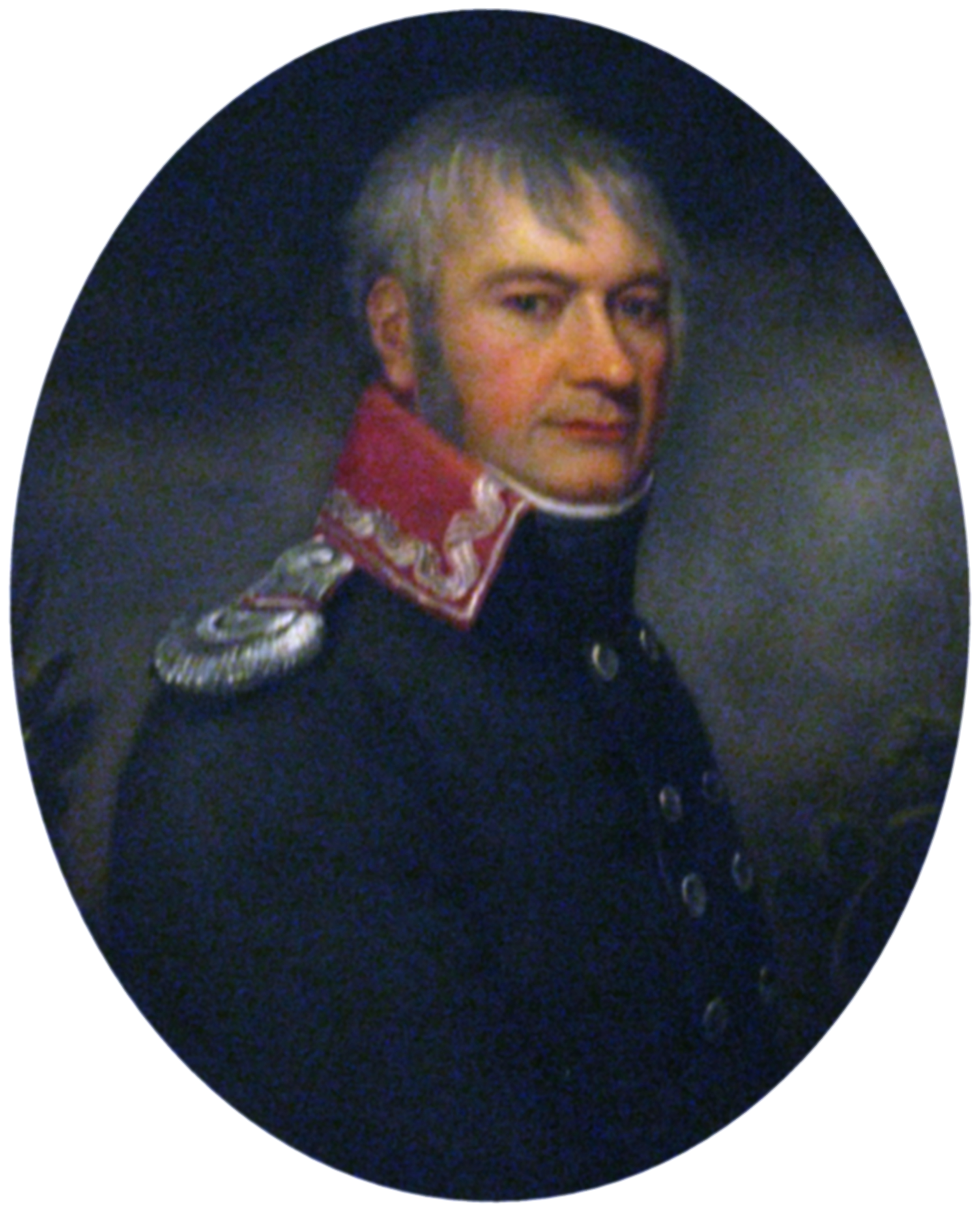

Personal details
- Born: 1759 Horochów
- Died: 1817 (aged 57–58) Rusinów
- Parents: Michał Wielhorski (father); Elżbieta Ogińska (mother)
- Occupation: Soldier

Military service
- Allegiance: Imperial Army (HRE); Crown Army; Kościuszko Insurgents; Polish Legions; Army of the Duchy of Warsaw; Army of Congress Poland
- Years of service: ?-1817
- Rank: Divisional General (Duchy of Warsaw)
- Commands: Ministry of War, Congress Poland; Ministry of War, Duchy of Warsaw (acting); 1st Legion, Polish Legions, Lombard Legion
- Battles/wars: Polish–Russian War (1792); Kościuszko Uprising; War of the First Coalition; Italian Campaign (1796); War of the Second Coalition; War of the Fifth Coalition

Józef Wielhorski (1759–1817) was a Polish officer of the House of Wielhorski, bearing the Kierdeja coat of arms. In his career, he successively served the Holy Roman Empire, the Polish-Lithuanian Commonwealth, the Polish Legions, the Duchy of Warsaw and later Congress Poland.

As an officer (rotmistrz) he fought in the Polish–Russian War of 1792 and later, as a Colonel, in the Kościuszko Uprising. Tadeusz Kościuszko sent him to revolutionary France with the goal of obtaining help from the Committee of Public Safety, his requests for a French expeditionary corps were, however, futile. Under Napoleon, he would become, in 1797, a general in the Polish Legions. From 1797 to 1802, he served in the Polish Legions in Italy, where he commanded the 1st Legion.

During the defense of Mantua, Adjutant General Wielhorski was sick in his bed due to an attack of gout and was replaced by Brigadier Meyer at Defensive Fortification Migliaretto and the Island of Te. Wielhorski, on the other hand, continually praised and supported the activity of the artillery commander Jakubowski, who was in Saint George's Fort, which became necessary to evacuate because of the impossibilty to resist any longer. The losses of its garrison were considerable. The captured Wielhorski and his staff later voiced complaints of the Austrian treatment of Polish captives, which went unheard. As a protest against the French-Austrian peace, he returned to partitioned Poland.

In 1809, with France again at war with Austria and finding his country under threats, he would organized armed forces in Kraków and Kielce, joining the pro-French Polish forces and was made a Divisional General in the Duchy of Warsaw, where he also became a Deputy Minister of War. From August 8, 1809, he was head of the Military Department of the Provisional Government of Galicia for military needs. In 1810, he was appointed Director of Food Supplies for the Army of the Duchy of Warsaw. During this period, Wielhorski took over the administrative duties of Minister Poniatowski when he left for Paris in 1811. The general supposedly "managed all of this so skillfully that Prince Józef's opponents, such as Dąbrowski and Zajączek, would gladly have Wielhorski permanently appointed Minister of War, and the impartial French resident Bignon stated that the Deputy Minister of War has in his character what almost all Poles lack: decisiveness and perseverance... if Prince Józef had been here, the army's mobilization would not have been so rapid, and... the measures we adopted for fortification work would neither have had the scope nor energy."

He remained in the Duchy during Napoleon's invasion of Russia; in its aftermath, in Congress Poland, he was a Minister of War and a member of its Senate. The Count passed away in 1817. Wielhorski was a Knight of the Order of the White Eagle (1815), awarded the Virtuti Militari, and the Legion of Honor.
