= Polish Legions (Napoleonic era) =

Polish military units that served with the French Army

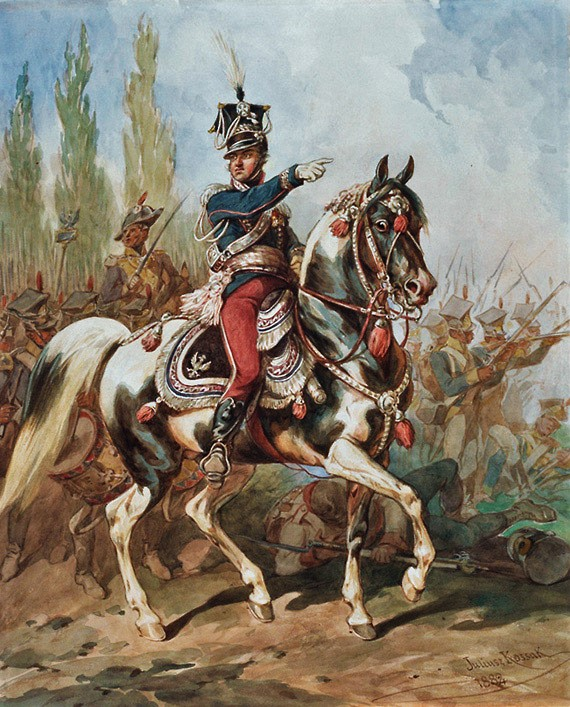
Jan Henryk Dąbrowski, the most famous commander of the Polish Legions

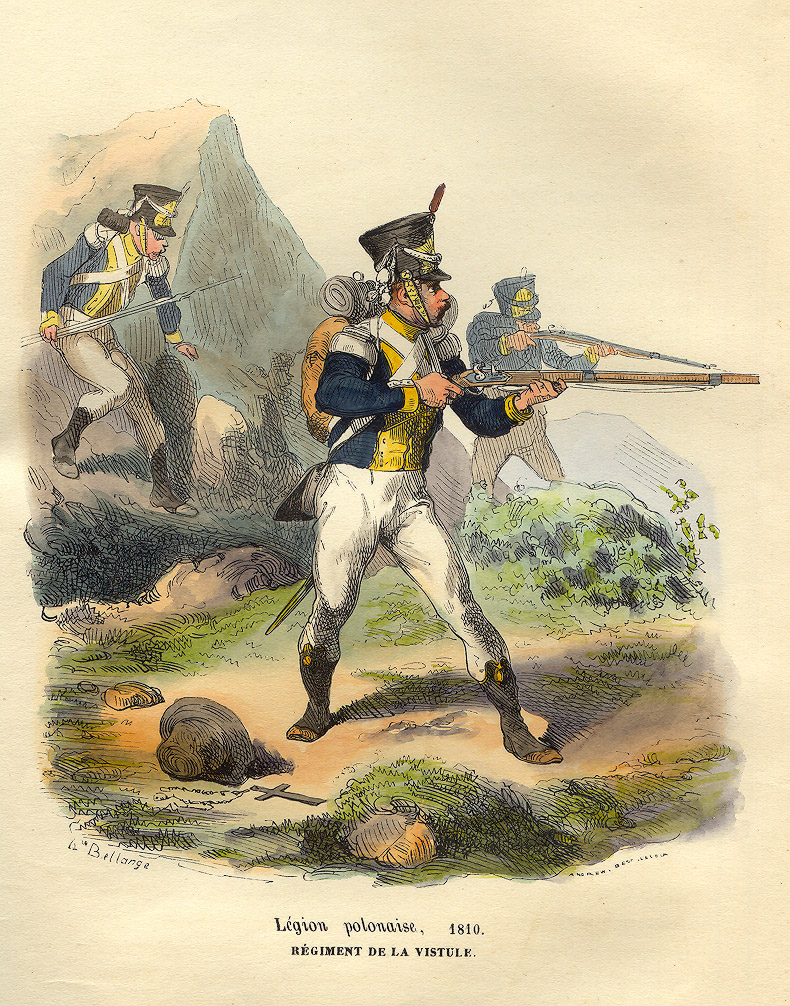
Infantry of the Vistula Legion

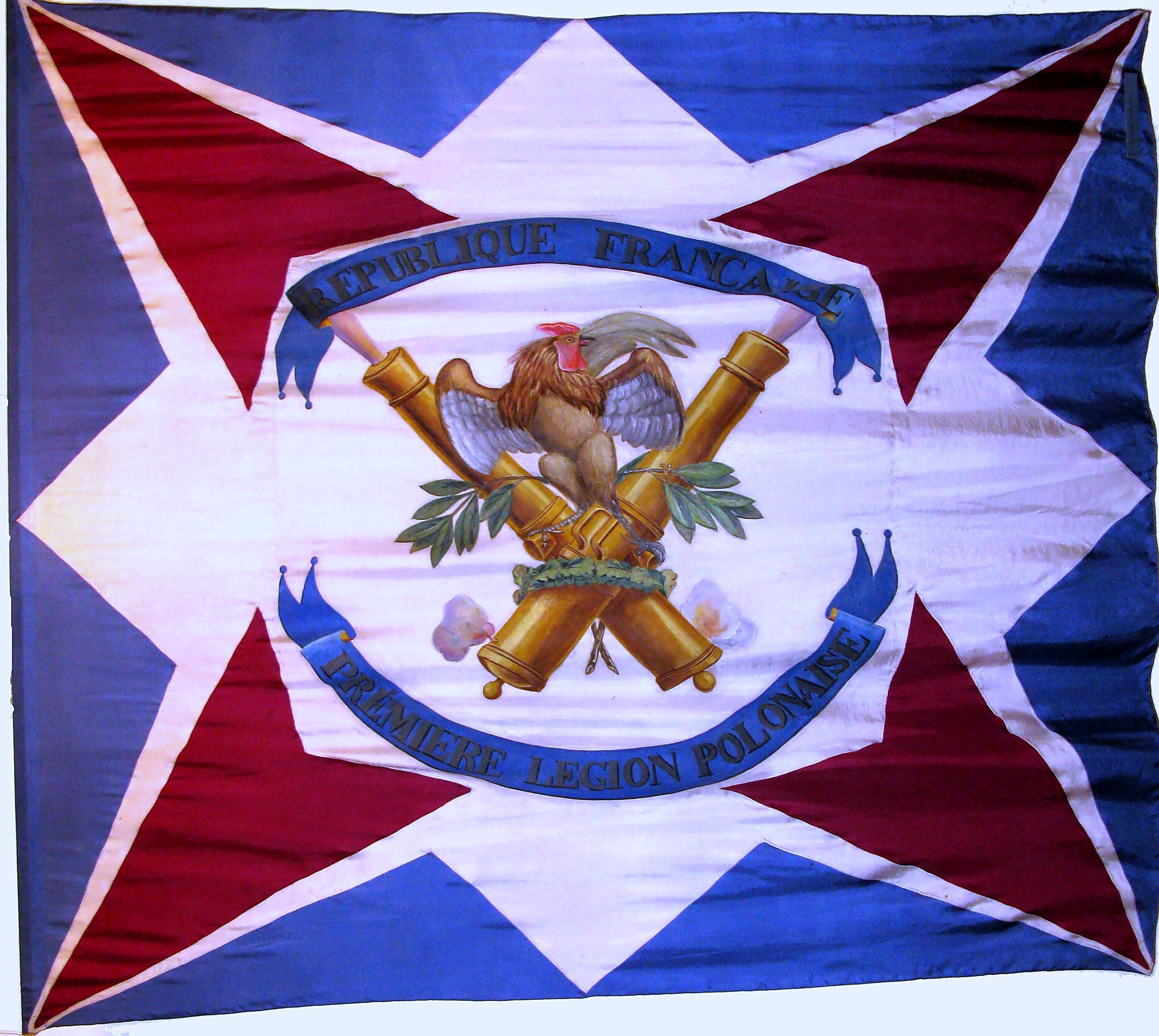
Banner of the 1st Legion of the Polish Legions in Italy

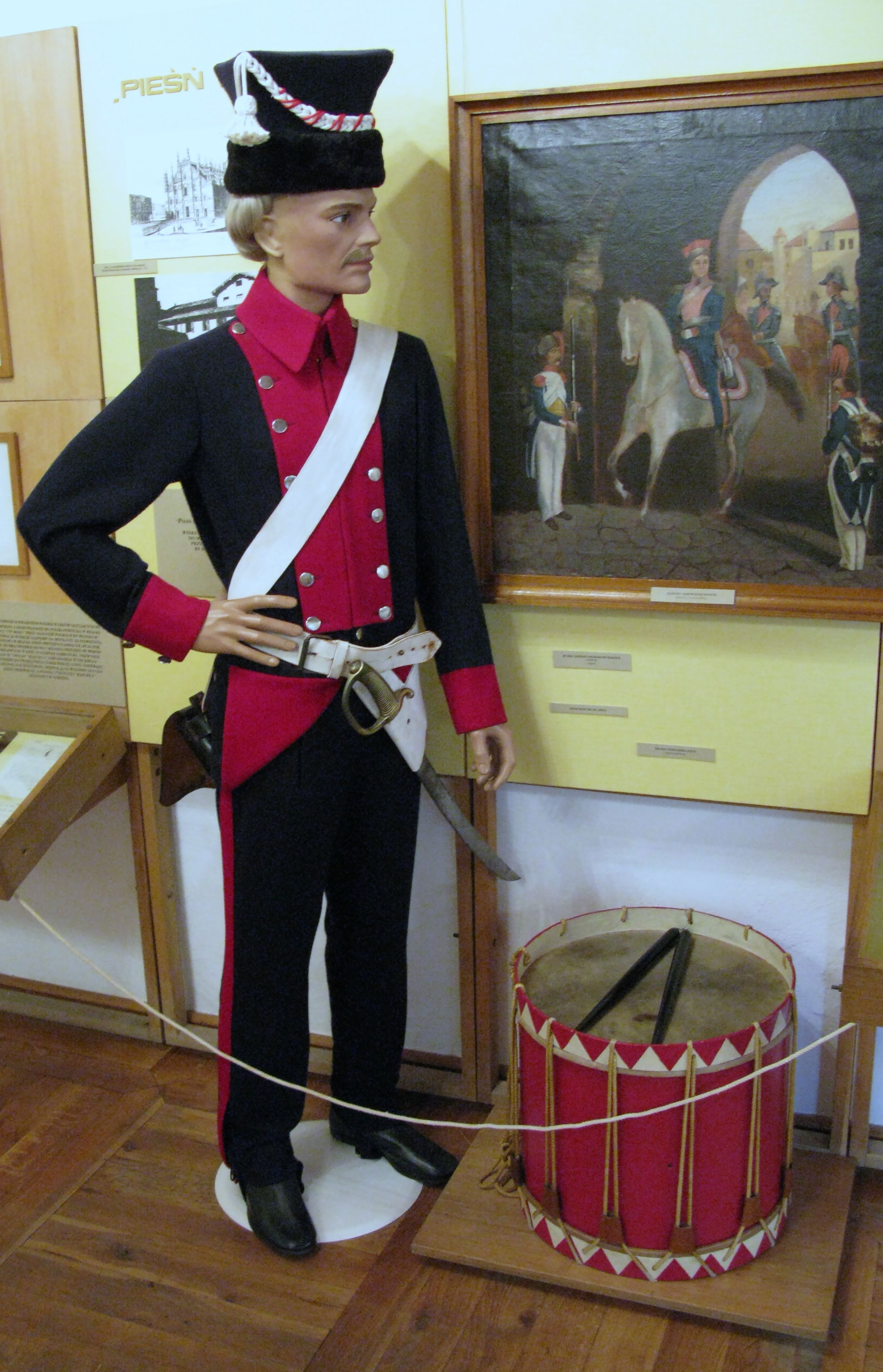
Polish Legion soldier in Italy

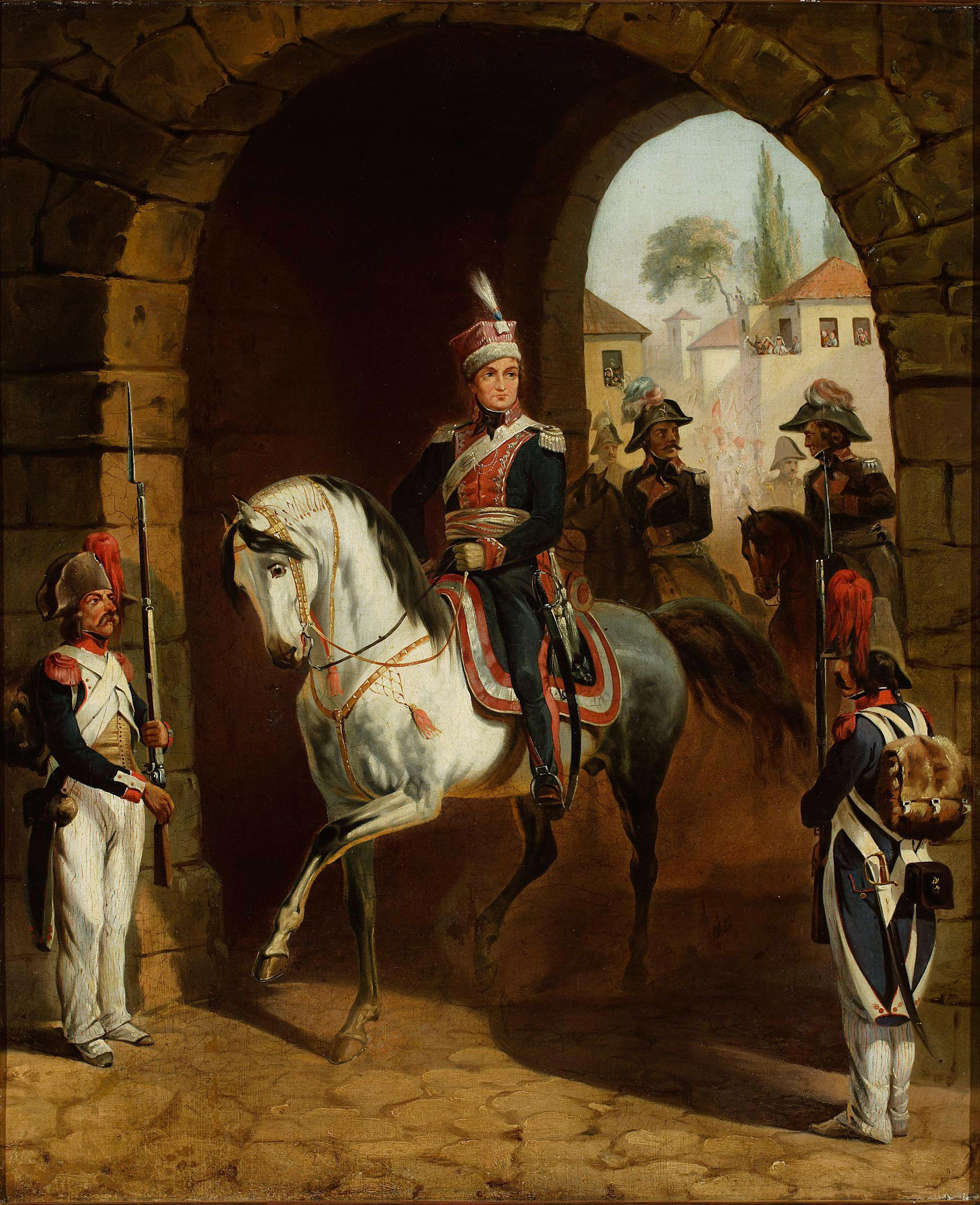
Dąbrowski's entry into Rome

The Polish Legions (Polish: Legiony Polskie we Włoszech; also known as the Dąbrowski Legions) were several Polish military units that served with the French Army in the Napoleonic era, mainly from 1797 to 1803, although some units continued to serve until 1815.

After the Third Partition of Poland in 1795, many Poles believed that Revolutionary France and her allies would come to Poland's aid. France's enemies included Poland's partitioners: Prussia, the Austrian Empire, and the Russian Empire. Many Polish soldiers, officers, and volunteers therefore emigrated, especially to the parts of Italy under French rule or serving as client states or sister republics to France (leading to the expression, "the Polish Legions in Italy") and to France itself, where they joined forces with the local military. The number of Polish recruits soon reached many thousands. With support from Napoleon Bonaparte, Polish military units were formed, bearing Polish military ranks and commanded by Polish officers. They became known as the "Polish Legions", a Polish army in exile, under French command. Their best known Polish commanders included Jan Henryk Dąbrowski, Karol Kniaziewicz and Józef Wybicki.

The Polish Legions serving alongside the French Army during the Napoleonic Wars saw combat in most of Napoleon's campaigns, from the West Indies, through Italy and Egypt. When the Duchy of Warsaw was created in 1807, many of the veterans of the Legions formed a core around which the Duchy's army was raised under Józef Poniatowski. This force fought a victorious war against Austria in 1809 and would go on to fight alongside the French army in numerous campaigns, culminating in the disastrous invasion of Russia in 1812, which marked the end of the Napoleonic empire, including the Legions, and allied states like the Duchy of Warsaw.

== Timeframe and numbers ==
Among historians there is a degree of uncertainty about the period in which the Legions existed. Magocsi et al. notes that "the heyday of their activity" falls in the years 1797–1801, while Lerski defines the Legions as units that operated between 1797 and 1803. Similarly, Davies defines the time of their existence as five to six years. The Polish PWN Encyklopedia defines them as units operating in the period of 1797–1801 (in 1801 the Legions were reorganized into demi-brigades). The Polish WIEM Encyklopedia notes that the Legions ended with the death of most of their personnel in the Saint-Domingue expedition, which concluded in 1803. When recounting the history of the Polish Legions, some works also describe the operations of Polish units under the French in the period after 1803; several smaller formations existed in that time, the most notable of which was the Vistula Legion, which existed between 1808 and 1813.

Estimates of the strength of the Polish Legions also vary and it is believed that between 20,000 and 30,000 men served in the Legions' ranks at any one time over the course of their existence. The WIEM Encyklopedia estimate is 21,000 for the period up to 1803. Davies suggests 25,000 for the period of up to 1802–1803, as does Paul Robert Magocsi et al. Bideleux and Jeffries offer an estimate of up to 30,000 for the period up to 1801. Most of the soldiers came from the ranks of the peasantry, with only about 10 percent being drawn from the nobility.

== Origins ==
After the Third Partition of Poland (1795), many Poles believed that revolutionary France, whose public opinion was very sympathetic to the ideals of the Polish Constitution of 3 May 1791, would come to Poland's aid. France's enemies included Poland's partitioners, Prussia, Austria and Russia. Paris was the seat of two Polish organizations laying the claim to be the Polish government-in-exile, the Deputation (Deputacja) of Franciszek Ksawery Dmochowski and the Agency (Agencja) of Józef Wybicki. Many Polish soldiers, officers and volunteers therefore emigrated, especially to Italy and to France. Eventually, the Agency was successful in convincing the French government (the Directory) to organize a Polish military unit. As the French Constitution did not allow for the employment of foreign troops on French soil, the French decided to use the Poles to bolster their client in Italy, the Cisalpine Republic.

Jan Henryk Dąbrowski, a former high-ranking officer in the army of the Polish–Lithuanian Commonwealth, began his work in 1796 – a year after the total destruction of the Commonwealth. At that time he went to Paris, and later, Milan, where his idea received support from Napoleon Bonaparte, who saw the Poles as a promising source of new recruits, and who superficially appeared receptive to the idea of liberating Poland. Dąbrowski was soon authorized by the French-allied Cisalpine Republic to create the Polish Legions, which would be part of the army of the newly created republic. This agreement, drafted by Napoleon, was signed on 9 January 1797, and marked the formal creation of the Legions.

== Operational history ==
=== War of the First Coalition: Polish Legions in Italy ===
The Polish soldiers serving in the Dąbrowski Legion were granted Cisalpine citizenship and were paid the same wage as other troops. They were allowed to use their own unique Polish-style uniforms, with some French and Cisalpine symbols, and were commanded by other Polish speakers. By early February 1797 the Legion was 1,200 strong, having been bolstered by the arrival of many new recruits who had deserted from the Austrian army.

The Dąbrowski Legion was first used against the Austrians and their allies in Italy. In March 1797 it garrisoned Mantua, and by the end of the month it took part in its first combat. By the end of April the ranks of the Legion had swelled to 5,000. At that time Dąbrowski lobbied for a plan to push through to the Polish territories in Galicia, but that was eventually rejected by Napoleon who instead decided to use those troops on the Italian front. In April, the Legion took part in quelling the uprising in Verona, known as Veronese Easters. The Treaty of Leoben signed that month, which promised peace between Austrians and French, was a blow to Polish morale, but Dąbrowski correctly assumed that it would not last.

Sources vary with regards to when the singular Dąbrowski Legion was expanded into multiple Legions. Pivka and Roffe note that in May 1797 the Legion was reorganized into two formations, the first being commanded by Karol Kniaziewicz and the second by Józef Wielhorski, each numbering about 3,750 infantry, not counting artillery support. Davies, however, states that the Second Legion was formed in 1798 under Józef Zajączek. In July 1797 the Legions suppressed another insurrection, this time in Reggio Emilia.

The Treaty of Campo Formio, signed on 18 October 1797, resulted in another short period of relative peace. The Legions, hopeful for a renewal of the war, were seen as the most pro-French foreign forces in the Cisalpine Republic. In May 1798 the Poles helped the French to secure the Papal States, putting down some peasant revolts, and garrisoned Rome, which they entered on 3 May. Dąbrowski obtained a number of trophies from a Roman representative, that the Polish king, John III Sobieski, had sent there after his victory over the Ottoman Empire at the siege of Vienna in 1683; amongst these was an Ottoman standard which subsequently became part of the Legions' colors, accompanying them from then on.

By the end of 1798 the Legions under Kniaziewicz were fighting against the anti-French forces from the Kingdom of Naples, defeating them at the Battle of Civita Castellana on 4 December. Soon afterward, supplies from the captured Gaeta fortress allowed the creation of a Legion cavalry unit under Andrzej Karwowski. The Poles then fought at Magliano, Falari, Calvi and Capua before Naples capitulated on 23 January.

=== War of the Second Coalition: Italian front ===
The end of the 1798 and the beginning of 1799 marked the beginning of the War of the Second Coalition. Within about a year of its formation, the Legion had become about 10,000. However, the new series of struggles proved to be much more difficult, as the anti-French coalition advanced upon Italy, now bereft of elite French units which were with Napoleon in Egypt. Overall, 1799 saw the Legions take significant casualties. In mid-1799, the First Legion under General Dąbrowski fought against the Russians at Trebbia (17–19 June 1799), where it suffered heavy casualties (only two of the five battalions survived the battle, and Dąbrowski was wounded). Polish legionaries also fought at the Battle of Novi (15 July 1799), and the Second Battle of Zurich (26 September).

The Second Legion also suffered heavily; particularly in the first battles on the Adige (26 March – 5 April 1799) where it is estimated that it lost about half to two thirds of its complement of 4,000 men. Its commander, General Franciszek Rymkiewicz, was killed at the Battle of Magnano on 5 April. The remainder of the Second Legion became part of the garrison at Mantua, which was soon placed under siege by the Austrians. Finally, at the end of the Siege of Mantua (April–July), the French commander François-Philippe de Foissac-Latour decided to release Polish soldiers – then under Wielhorski – into Austrian custody as the Austrians claimed them to be deserters. This marked the end of the Second Legion, as only a small number of Poles were able to evade capture (the French were allowed to withdraw most of their forces under the condition that they would remain neutral).

=== War of the Second Coalition: German front ===
With the end of the Cisalpine Republic, the Legions were reorganized in France, as Napoleon ascended to power as the First Consul and decreed that foreign troops could now serve in the French Army. On 10 February the remnants of the Italian Legions were reorganized near Marseille into the Italian Legion (La Legion Italique) as a 9,000-strong unit (although soon reduced to 5,000) that would become part of the Army of Italy. The Legion fought at Peschiera and Mantua.

On 8 September 1799 Karol Kniaziewicz raised the Danube Legion (Legion du Danube) to fight against the Austrians in Bavaria. The Danube Legion, bolstered by Karwowski's uhlan regiment, served as part of the Army of the Rhine at Berg and Offenburg, garrisoning the fortress of Philippsbourg after the Armistice of Parsdorf was signed 15 July. It also fought in the Battle of Hohenlinden on 3 December 1800. According to Davies, the Danube Legion suffered significant casualties in the short period between the battle's conclusion and the end of the campaign on 25 December that year.

The size of the Legions decreased after the Treaty of Lunéville (9 February 1801), which to the disappointment of the legionnaires made no mention of Poland. The Legions was transferred to police duties in the Kingdom of Etruria. The Legions' morale weakened as Poles were not used in any fights that seemed to directly affect the chance of Poland regaining independence. Many legionnaires, including General Kniaziewicz, felt that they had been used by the French and resigned. Dąbrowski remained in command, and reorganized both Legions at Milan into two 6,000-strong units in March 1801. On 21 December 1801, the Polish Legions were reorganized by the French into three half-brigades, with the Italian Legion forming the core of the 1st and 2nd Polish Half-Brigades, and the Danube Legion being reorganised into the 3rd Polish Half-Brigade.

=== Saint-Domingue expedition ===
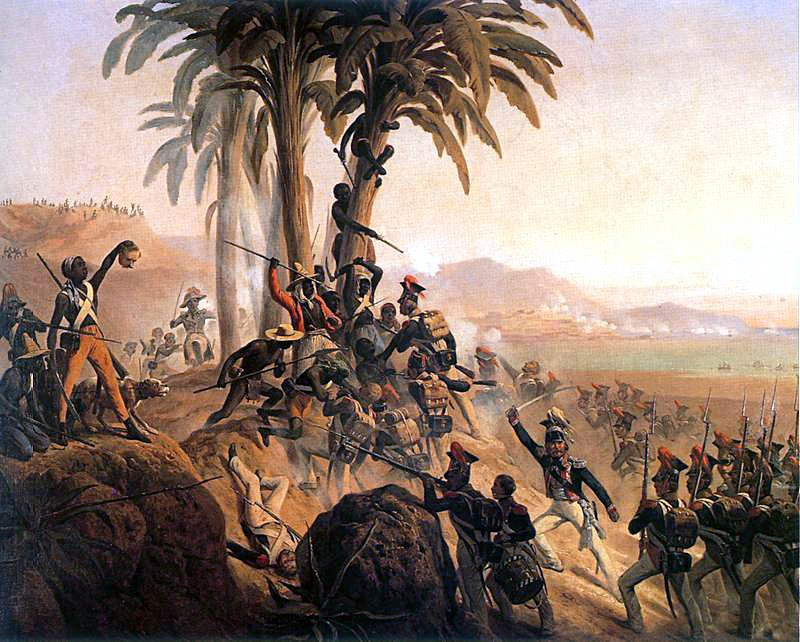
Polish Legions in Saint Domingue, January Suchodolski

In May 1802, the French sent the 3rd Polish Half-Brigade (5,280 strong) to Saint-Domingue, which had been recently captured by an expedition force under Charles Leclerc from autonomous Black commander Toussaint Louverture. Napoleon wanted to regain control over Saint-Domingue, but preferred to save his main French army for more important matters, closer to home. The now inconvenient Polish units were accompanied by contingents of German, Swiss and Italian troops, as well as French units that had fallen out of favour with Napoleon and the French high command.

The Saint-Domingue expedition proved disastrous for the Poles, who arrived at Cap‑Français on 4 September, unaware that two days earlier their unit had officially been renamed the 113th Line Infantry Half-Brigade. Combat casualties and tropical diseases such as yellow fever reduced the half-brigade to a few hundred survivors in the space of less than two years. By the time French forces withdrew from the colony in December 1803, about 4,000 Poles had died (either from disease or combat). Of the survivors, about 400 deserted remained on the island, a few dozen were dispersed to the nearby islands or to the United States, and about 700 returned to France. (Urbankowski claims 6,000 sent and 330 returned.)

The Poles had minimal interest or desire to support the French cause in their colonies. The loss of military personnel in the Caribbean was a serious blow to the Polish aspirations for regaining independence. The experience cast further doubts among Poles about France's intentions toward Poland.

=== Wars of the Third and Fourth Coalition ===
By 1805, during the War of the Third Coalition, the Polish troops in Italy had been renamed the 1st Polish Legion (1e Legion Polonaise) and attached to the Kingdom of Italy. In 1806, all that was left of the old Dąbrowski and Kniaziewicz's Legions was one demi-brigade, consisting of one infantry regiment and one cavalry regiment, now in the service of the Kingdom of Naples. It fought at Castel Franco, turning the Austrian attack on 24 November 1805, but on 3 July 1806 it suffered a severe defeat at Sant'Eufemia a Maiella. Many Polish officers served in French army or allied formations.

During the War of the Fourth Coalition, Napoleon decided to encourage Polish defections from the Prussian army, and on 20 September 1806 decreed the creation of a "Northern Legion" under General Zajączek. As the Napoleon did not want to commit himself to the Polish cause, the Legion was however not explicitly Polish, and was, in Napoleon's words, a gathering of "children of the North". French armies, including the Legion units, defeated the Prussians in Saxony at the Battle of Jena and Poles under Dąbrowski entered former Polish territories (near the city of Poznań), which resulted in the influx of recruits for the legion. A year later, Napoleon, having defeated the Russian armies, met with the Russian Tsar Alexander I at Tilsit and in the ensuing Treaties of Tilsit they agreed that a new, small Polish state under French control (the Duchy of Warsaw) would be created.

=== After the creation of the Duchy of Warsaw: the Vistula Legion ===
The main period that the Legions were active was between 1797 and 1803, although some chose to continue serving the French in Italy. In 1806, two Polish battalions fought at the battle of Maida, where they were defeated by British and Sicilian troops. In 1807, veterans of the Polish Legion formed the backbone of the new Army of the Duchy of Warsaw. In February 1807, the remaining infantry and cavalry regiments who had continued in French service in Italy were reorganized in Silesia, in the cities of Breslau, Neustadt, Neisse, Friedland and Brieg, into a Polish-Italian Legion (PolaccoItalienne), with two new infantry regiments added from the newly liberated Polish lands. On 21 February 1808, the Legion was relocated to France, reinforced with Poles from other French formations, and incorporated into the French army. On 31 March of that year the legion was officially named the Vistula Legion (Légion de la Vistule, Legia Nadwiślańska). By mid-1808 the Vistula Legion had a strength of 6,000. After the Battle of Wagram (5–6 July 1809) Napoleon attempted to form a second Polish Vistula Legion from Polish prisoners of war, but the new formation could not attract sufficient recruits, and in 1810 it was merged into the original Vistula Legion.

During the Peninsular War in Spain, the Vistula Legion gained fame at the Second Siege of Zaragoza. In the Battle of Fuengirola, a small Franco-Polish force managed to repulse an Anglo-Spanish army which greatly outnumbered them, capturing their commander Lord Blayney in the process. The 1st Light Cavalry Lancers Regiment of the Imperial Guard (Polish) distinguished itself at the Battle of Somosierra in 1808. Another Polish cavalry regiment – the Vistula uhlans – also fought in Spain. They distinguished themselves many times there, including at the Battle of Albuera in 1811, where they fought to a draw against a combined force of British, Spanish and Portuguese troops. Their effectiveness in that battle inspired the British Army to create their own lancer units equipped with Polish-style uniforms and weapons.

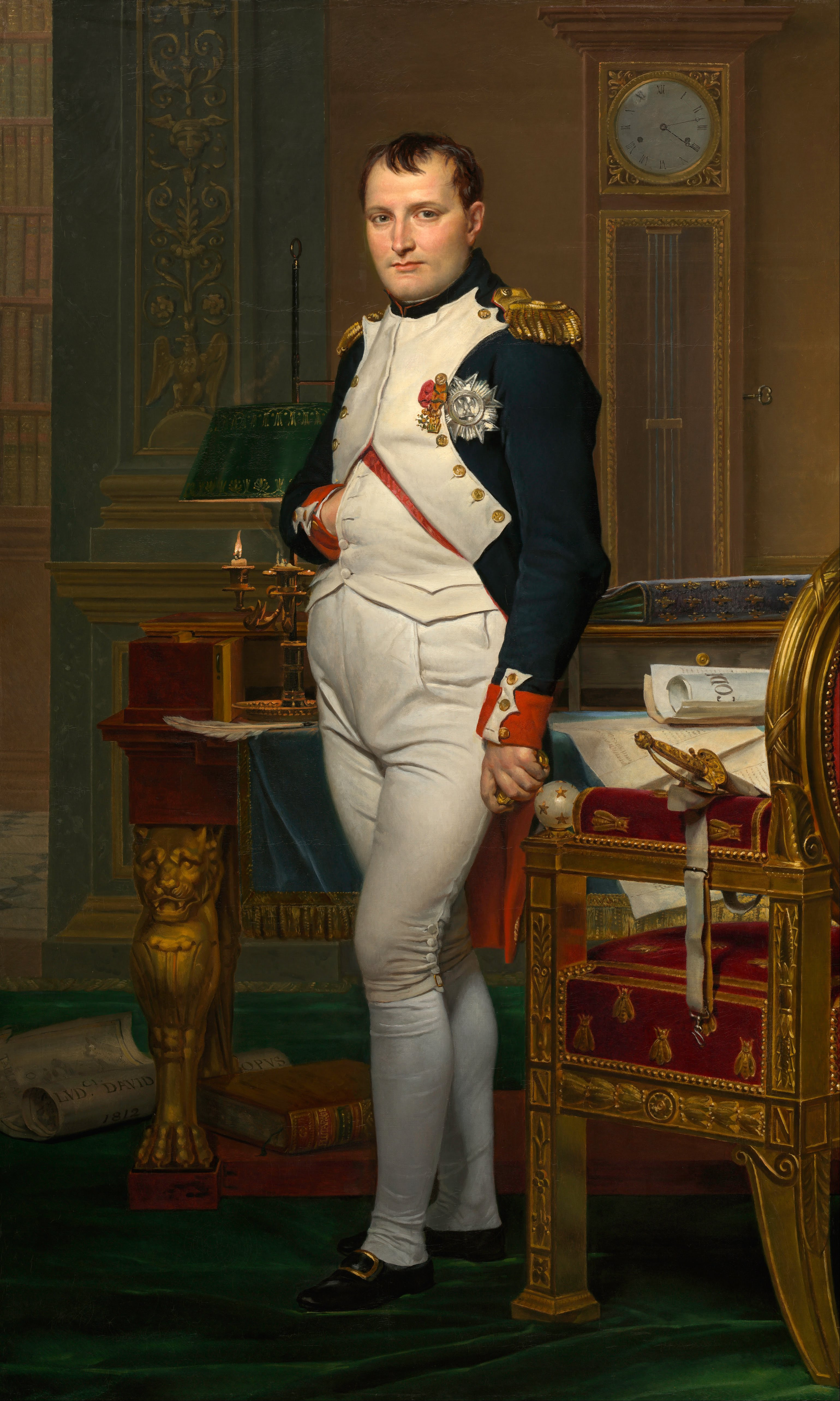
French Emperor Napoleon I

In 1812, as Napoleon invaded Russia, the Poles and Lithuanians rallied to his Grande Armée in the hope of resurrecting the Commonwealth. The Vistula Legion, withdrawn from Spain in early 1812 and reorganized into a division (with a planned strength of 10,500 that was never fully attained) was part of Napoleon's invasion forces. Poles formed the largest foreign contingent, 98,000-strong (the entire French Grande Armée was about 600,000 strong). Polish Lancers of the Vistula Legion were the first unit to cross the Neman river when the Grande Armée entered Russia and, as part of the Imperial Guard, the first unit to enter Moscow. They distinguished themselves in the Battle of Borodino and, under Prince Józef Poniatowski (who personally saved Napoleon's life), were one of the units that served as the rear guard during Napoleon's retreat. This later led to the claim that just as they had been the first to enter it, they were the last to leave Russia. They sustained heavy losses during the campaign: only 26,000 of the original 98,000-strong contingent returned. The elite Vistula Legion entering Russia was about 7,000 strong; its strength at the end of the campaign was just 1,500.

The definitive end of the Polish Legions came with the conclusion of Napoleon's career and the abolition of the Duchy of Warsaw. The Duchy was occupied by Prussian and Russian troops following Napoleon's retreat from Russia. The Polish troops remained loyal to him until the bitter end, with Polish units holding their ground at Leipzig (15–19 October 1813) and Hanau (30–31 October 1813), where they sustained major losses. The Legion was recreated at Sedan in early 1814, and fought at Soissons, Reims, Arcis-sur-Aube and St-Dizier. After Napoleon's defeat in the War of the Sixth Coalition, when Napoleon was forced into exile on Elba, the only unit he was allowed to keep as guards were the Polish Lancers. While many Poles returned to the Polish territories, a unit of about 325 men under Colonel Golaszewski fought in Napoleon's final 1815 campaign, the "Hundred Days", participating in the Battle of Waterloo. After Napoleon's second and final defeat, some are said to have accompanied him to his exile on Saint Helena.

== Assessment and remembrance ==
In analyzing the creation of the Polish Legions, many historians have argued that Napoleon used the Poles as a source of recruits and had little desire to invest in the re-creation of the Polish state. Among the most notable of Napoleon's contemporary Polish detractors was Tadeusz Kościuszko, who refused to join the Legions, arguing that Napoleon would not restore Poland in any durable form. In this regard, Kościuszko also stated that the Duchy of Warsaw was created in 1807 only because it was expedient, rather than because Napoleon supported Polish sovereignty. Nevertheless, the memory of Napoleon's Polish Legions is strong in modern Poland, and Napoleon himself is often regarded as a hero and liberator there. About the Polish Legion, Napoleon himself is reputed to have said that 800 Poles would equal 8,000 enemy soldiers.

Despite their destruction, the Legions became legendary in Poland, helping to spread the civic and democratic ideals of the French Revolution throughout the country. The legionnaires formed a cadre for the Army of the Duchy of Warsaw and also later for the Army of Congress Poland.

The Legions are also notable as in their ranks, in 1797, a song was composed called Song of the Polish Legions in Italy better known as Mazurek Dąbrowskiego which would become the Polish national anthem in 1926 and 1927. The song contains the refrain of From Italy to Poland which was the goal of the Legions under their leader Dąbrowski and Poland is not yet lost, as long as we still live in referring to the Legions.

== See also ==
- Great Emigration
- History of Poland (1795-1918)
- List of Polish legionnaires (Napoleonic period)
- Polish–Russian War of 1792
