= Danube Legion =

- Légion du Danube; Legia Naddunajska
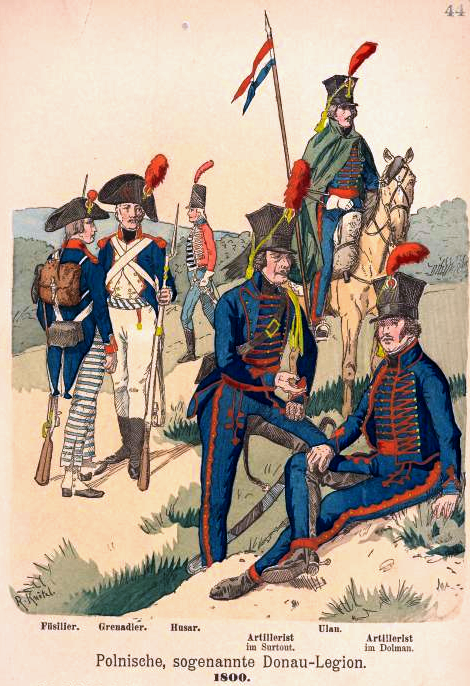
- Soldiers of the Danube Legion in 1800 (Richard Knötel, 1914)
- Active: 8 September 1799 – 1803
- Country: France
- Type: Light cavalry, line infantry, field artillery
- Part of: French Revolutionary Army
- Nickname: Legion of the Rhine
- Engagements: French Revolutionary Wars; War of the Second Coalition; Battle of Hohenlinden; Haitian Revolution; Saint-Domingue expedition

The Danube Legion (Polish: Legia Naddunajska; French: Legion du Danube) was a Polish Legion of the French Revolutionary Army which existed from 1799 to 1803.

It was renamed as the 3rd Polish Half-Brigade in December 1801 and the 113th Line Infantry Half-Brigade on September 1802, before being amalgamated with the 114th Line Infantry Half-Brigade in 1803.

== Creation ==
The Danube Legion was raised on 8 September 1799 in the Batavian Republic by Brigadier-General Karol Kniaziewicz. One of the French Revolutionary Army's Polish Legions, its ranks consisted of Polish volunteers and Austrian Army prisoners of war who were ethnic Poles. At its establishment, the unit consisted of four infantry battalions with a theoretical strength of 1,230 men each, an uhlan regiment theoretically 928 men strong and a field artillery company. With a general staff of 15 officers, the Danube Legion was placed under Kniaziewicz's direct command and made available for French military operations.

== Service in Germany and Italy ==
The Danube Legion was subsequently sent to Southern Germany and assigned to the Army of the Rhine, serving under Divisional-General Jean Victor Marie Moreau and being stationed at Berg and Offenburg; in May 1800, French records indicated the unit consisted of 2,769 officers and soldiers. It was sent to garrison Philippsbourg in France after the Armistice of Parsdorf was signed between France and Austria on 15 July 1800, before being dispatched to Italy and integrated into Divisional-General Charles Mathieu Isidore Decaen's 3rd Division. Once the armistice lapsed on 12 November, hostilities between the French and Austrians resumed, and the Danube Legion fought under Moreau at the Battle of Hohenlinden on 3 December, a major French victory over an Austro-Bavarian army which led the Austrians to seek peace terms with France. The unit suffered heavy personnel losses between the battle's end and 25 December.

On 9 February 1801, the Treaty of Lunéville was signed, ending the war between France and Austria. To the disappointment of Polish troops in French service, the treaty made no mention of Poland, even though they expected to march on and liberate it from Austrian, Prussian and Russian occupation. The treaty also downsized the Polish Legions, who were stationed in the newly-formed Kingdom of Etruria for internal security duties. Many Polish officers and soldiers felt used by the French and resigned in response, including Kniaziewicz. In March 1801 at Milan, General Jan Henryk Dąbrowski reorganised Polish troops in French service into two units each approximately 6,000 strong, one of which was the Danube Legion. Two months later in May, Brigadier-General Władysław Franciszek Jabłonowski was appointed to command the unit, and on 21 December the Danube Legion was renamed the 3rd Polish Half-Brigade.

== Service in Saint-Domingue ==
In May 1802, the French government ordered the 3rd Polish Half-Brigade to be sent to the West Indian colony of Saint-Domingue, which an expeditionary force under Divisional-General Charles Leclerc had retaken from autonomous Black commander Toussaint Louverture. Dąbrowski complained about the posting from his headquarters in Milan, but subsequently acquiesced. Stanisław Fiszer turned down an officer to command the unit and returned to Poland, resulting in Frenchman Fortunat Bernard being appointed as the half-brigade's commander in his stead. After a storm thwarted an initial attempt to depart, the 3rd Polish Half-Brigade left Livorno onboard a French fleet on 17 May, reaching Cádiz on 11 July. There, Bernard requested the French government reorganise his unit into a regular line infantry half-brigade. The fleet set sail again on 24 July, where most of the unit's soldiers were informed they were bound for Saint-Domingue.

The 3rd Polish Half-Brigade, consisting of roughly 5,280 men divided into three battalions, arrived at Cap‑Français on 4 September, where they discovered that another revolt against French rule had broken out. Unbeknownst to the unit, Minister of War Louis-Alexandre Berthier had redesignated it as the 113th Line Infantry Half-Brigade on 2 September, though news of this change did not reach Saint-Domingue until November, by which time the half-brigade had suffered heavy casualties due to combat and tropical diseases such as yellow fever. These factors resulted in the unit being reduced to a few hundred survivors by December, when French forces agreed to be repatriated back to Europe by British ships. Approximately 4,000 soldiers of the 113th Line Infantry Half-Brigade died, with a few hundred choosing to switch sides and join the rebels; the unit suffered such heavily casualties that it was amalgamated into the 114th Line Infantry Half-Brigade in 1803.

=== 1st Battalion ===
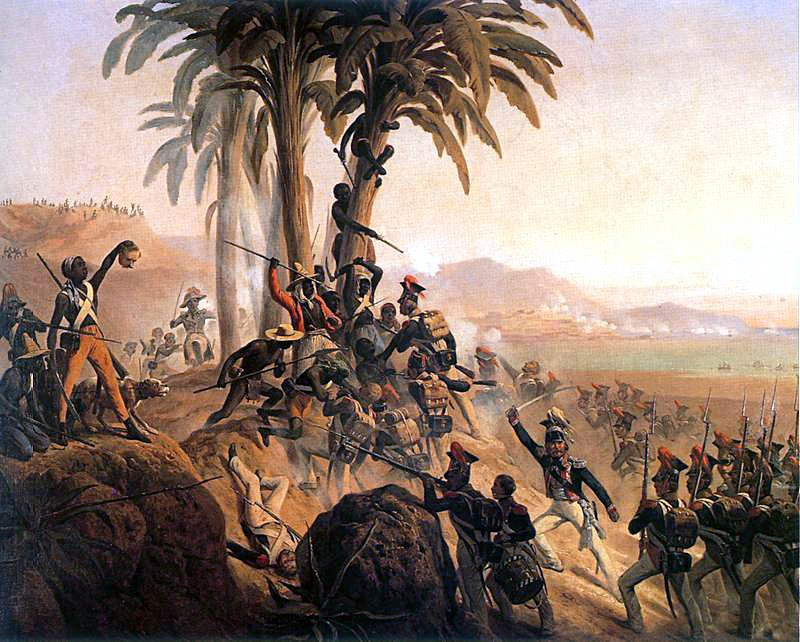
Polish troops fighting against Black rebels during the Saint-Domingue expedition

The 1st Battalion was commanded by Wodzinski and joined the French Northern Division led by General Jean Boudet, but soon to be replaced by General Bertrand Clauzel. Upon arrival on September 2, Charles Leclerc reckoned their strength as 984. By the end of November they were estimated to be 80 men who were then attached to the French 74th Line Infantry Demi-brigade. By September 23, 1803, French military records state that only 6 officers and 14 men were still alive.

=== 2nd Battalion ===
The 2nd Battalion was commanded by Wojciech Bolesta and was assigned to Jean-Jacques Dessalines mixed division. It comprised eight regular companies plus accompany of grenadiers consisting of 775 men in all.

=== 3rd Battalion ===
The 3rd Battalion were commanded by Franciszek Grabski. They were assigned to the Right Northern Division commanded by General Jean Baptiste Brunet. Of the original 21 officers and 768 soldiers only 634 men joined Brunet's division, the remainder being in hospital. The 3rd Company was under the command of Captain Sangowski, who understood little French. He unwisely led them into an exposed position at Dubrail, an unfortified plantation where they were attacked by the rebels. After running out of ammunition they surrendered, only for the rebels to start massacring them. However, Navarrez led some troops of the 86th Line Infantry Demi-brigade to their rescue, by which time only four were still alive, a total of thirty five having been killed. Sangowski, who had escaped by hiding in a swamp later died of pneumonia, thus avoiding court-martial.

== Bibliography ==
- Pachoński, Jan; Wilson, Reuel K. (1986). Poland's Caribbean Tragedy: a Study of Polish Legions in The Haitian War of Independence 1802-1803. East European Monographs.
