= Józef Wielhorski (composer) =

Polish Musician

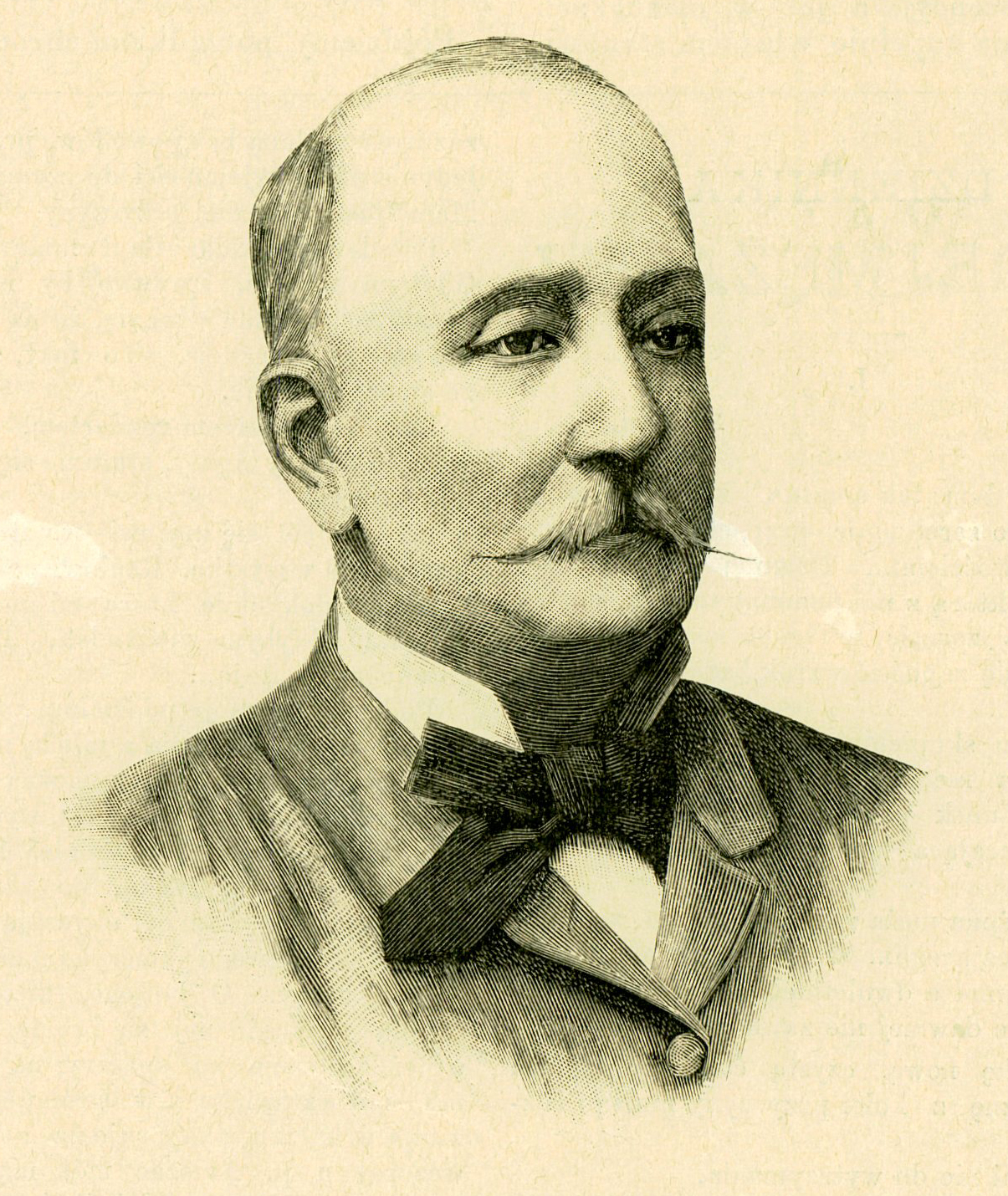
Józef Wielhorski

Count Józef Wielhorski (1816/1817–1892) was a Polish pianist and composer.

== Life and compositions ==
Józef Wielhorski was born in Rusinów, Radom Governorate, in 1817 or 1818. His parents were count Józef Wielhorski and Salomea Dembińska (daughter of Wolbromska). When young Frédéric Chopin visited Rusinów, Józef swooned by listening to him playing piano. While studying at Berlin university, he took lessons from Wilhelm Taubert. He married Marya Iżycka, but this marriage provided no children.

Wielhorski was neither a professional virtuoso, nor a professional composer. He highly esteemed Mozart's music. According to Polish musician Jan Kleczyński, his own compositions, though being mostly bagatelles, valses and mazurkas, bear little reminiscences to those of Chopin. Another of his favorite genres was march. His compositions did not gain success even during his life, and he was not interested in this. Kleczyński explained such a failure through their relative difficulty: Wielhorski asks for much larger hands than was typical in salon music. His friend, the composer Aleksander Zarzycki performed some pieces by Wielhorski in concerts.

He died in a hotel in Sanremo, Italy, in an elevator accident.

== Sources ==
- Nekrologia. – Warsaw: Echo Muzyczne, 1892, No. 442 (March 19/7), p. 142.
- Jan Kleczyński. Józef hrabia Wielhorski (1894). – Warsaw: Echo Muzyczne, 1894, Nos. 567–570.
