= Siege of Mantua (1799) =

Part of the War of the Second Coalition

- Part of Suvorov's Italian campaign during the War of the Second Coalition
Date	April–July 1799
Location	Mantua, present-day Italy 45.1600°N 10.8000°E
Result	Austrian victory

Belligerents
(French First Republic) France: Polish Legion	(Habsburg monarchy) Austria

Commanders and leaders
François Philippe de Latour-Foissac	Pál Kray

Strength
10,000; 657 artillery pieces	8,000 rising to 40,000; ~150 artillery pieces

Casualties and losses
1,700 dead 1,400 or more wounded	Unknown

War of the Second Coalition:
Italy
current battle
Napoleon in command
Napoleon not in command

The siege of Mantua (1799) was a four-month effort by the Austrian army to regain a presence in northern Italy after being excluded from that region by Napoleon Bonaparte through the successful French siege of Mantua in 1797. In April 1799, the Austrians placed a military blockade around Mantua as part of the War of the Second Coalition with the intent of withering the French by attrition. While the diminishing food supplies and losses weakened the French army, the Austrians received reinforcements and attacked on 4 July 1799. By the end of the month, the French agreed to surrender.

== Background ==
The War of the Second Coalition that begun around late 1798 or early 1799 (depending on periodization) was the second war on revolutionary France by most of the European monarchies. Austria, still weakened and in deep financial debt from the War of the First Coalition, sought primarily to recover its position and come out of the war stronger than when it had entered. It aimed to regain a presence in northern Italy after being excluded from that region by Napoleon Bonaparte through the successful French siege of Mantua that ended in French Victory in 1797 during the War of the First Coalition.

== Prelude ==
By 1799, the fortress of Mantua on the river Mincio in northern Italy was in poor shape. It was commanded by viscount lieutenant general François Philippe de Latour-Foissac and garrisoned by a diverse force of 10,000, including French, Polish (Polish Legionnaires under general Józef Wielhorski), Italian (Republic of Alba and Cisalpine Republic), Swiss and German units. From the beginning of his assignment, Foissac-Latour, an engineer, was convinced that the fortress would be indefensible in any serious siege.

== Siege ==
In April, Austrian forces approached Mantua and started their siege. At first, the Austrians were content to simply blockade the fortress, but with the artillery duels and occasional skirmishes, attrition began taking its toll on the defenders. The defenders were also weakened by diminishing food supplies, and their morale was undermined by lack of payment.

On 18 June, the French suffered a defeat at the Battle of Trebbia, and consequently the Austrians were able to move more decisively against Mantua. On 4 July the siege entered a new stage, with Austrian reinforcements arriving, and the besieging force growing from 8,000 to 40,000. The Austrians were commanded by Hungarian general Baron Pál Kray, an artillery expert. Artillery bombardment was constant. On 24–25 July the assault begun; and the Austrians slowly advanced over the next few days. On 27 July Foissac-Latour began negotiating surrender terms.

== Capitulation ==
The Austrians agreed to release most of the French garrison, keeping the officers for three months, and with soldiers pledging not to take arms until the prisoners were exchanged by the fighting sides. In a secret protocol, however, the Austrians demanded full sovereignty over "deserters from the Austrian army". After protests from the Polish officers — who were afraid that due to recent partitions of Poland in which Austria gained control over parts of Poland that the Austrians may want to take custody of the Polish legionnaires — the Austrian negotiator clarified officially that they meant any deserters from the current Austrian army or former Austrian soldiers serving in the Cisalpine Republic Army.

On 30 July the French and allied troops left the fortress. The garrison troops were split into French and non-French units (of whom Poles still constituted 1,800); the Austrian soldiers observing the marching non-French garrison troops were given permission to physically assault those "recognized" as deserters and most of them were eventually arrested. Polish officers — particularly those from the Austrian partition — were forced to enlist in the Austrian army or deported to partitioned Poland, and a similar fate befell Polish NCOs and regular soldiers, many of whom were also forced to suffer physical punishment by being beaten with rods. This marked the end of the Second Legion of the Polish Legions. Foissac-Latour was later criticized by the Poles for what they considered "betrayal", but also by the French: for his surrender, Napoleon himself ordered Foissac-Latour stricken from the list of generals and forbade him to wear a military uniform.
