= Karol Kniaziewicz =

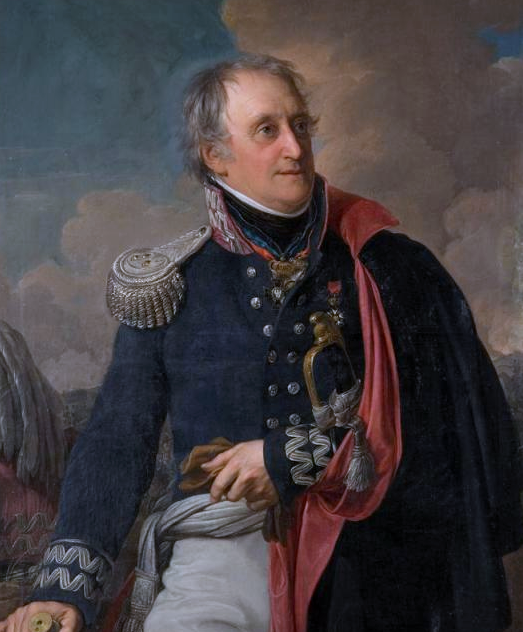
Karol Kniaziewicz

Baron Karol Otto Kniaziewicz (4 May 1762 in Assiten, Courland (now Asīte, Latvia) – 9 May 1842 in Paris) was a Polish general and political activist.

Karol attended the Knight School in Warsaw. He participated in the Polish-Russian war of 1792 and the Kościuszko Uprising in the rank of a Major-General in 1794. He distinguished himself during the Napoleonic Wars in the Polish Legions as commander of the 1st Legion. In 1799 he was appointed to the position of a Brigadier General. From 1799 until 1801 he organized and commanded the "Danube Legion" (Legia Naddunajska), he distinguished himself during the Battle of Hohenlinden.

Since 1812 Brigadier General in the Duchy of Warsaw. He participated in the Russian Campaign of 1812. In 1814 he left Poland for France. During the November Uprising in 1830–1831 he served as representative of the "Polish National Government" in Paris. In emigration Karol was politically tied with the "Hôtel Lambert" and Adam Jerzy Czartoryski. He was one of the co-founders of the Polish Library in Paris.

== Awards ==
- Commander's Cross of the Virtuti Militari (17 November 1812)
- Chevalier of the Légion d'honneur
