= Michał Wielhorski (elder) =

Polish noble

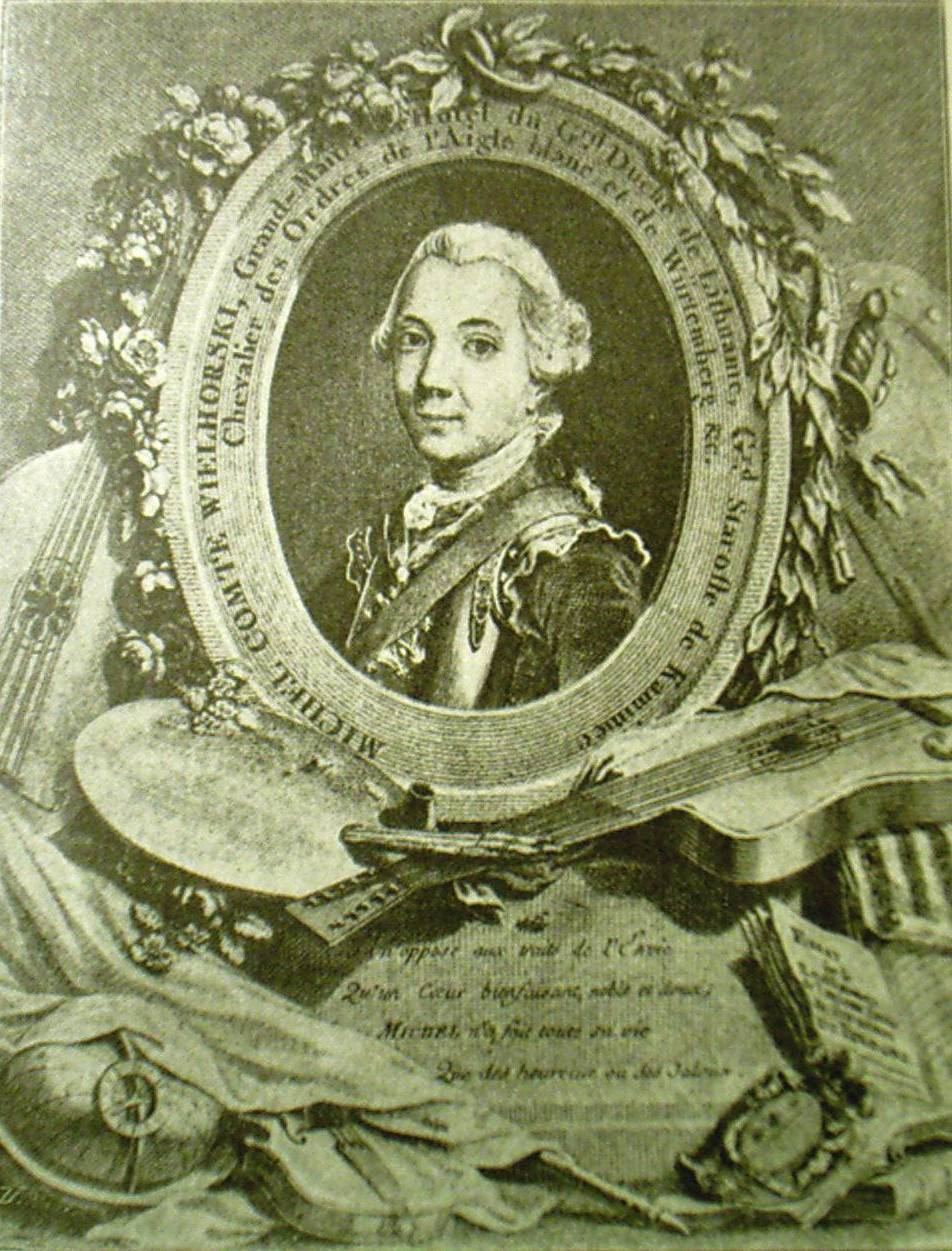
- Coat of arms: Kierdeja
- Born: c. 1730
- Died: 1794
- Noble family: Wielhorski
- Consort: Elżbieta Ogińska; Countess de Traversier
- Issue: with Elżbieta Ogińska; Michał Wielhorski; Jerzy Wielhorski; Józef Wielhorski
- Father: Feliks Ignacy Wielhorski
- Mother: Ludwika Zamoyska

Michał Wielhorski h. Kierdeja (c. 1730 – 1794) was a Polish noble, official, politician, diplomat and writer. He was the Lithuanian Master of the Kitchen in the years 1763–1774, Lithuanian Great Quartermaster in 1758–1762, starost and envoy of the Bar Confederation to France.

== Family ==
He married Elżbieta Ogińska and was the father of three sons.

- Michał Wielhorski (1755–1805), general, husband of Celina Przeuska h. Sulima and Aleksandra Kurdwanowska h. Półkozic
- Jerzy Wielhorski (1755–1809), field clerk of Lithuania
- Józef Wielhorski (1759–1817), general
