= Battle of Ampfing =

The Battle of Ampfing may refer to one of two battles at or near Ampfing, located in present-day Bavaria, Germany:

- Battle of Mühldorf, also known as the Battle of Ampfing in 1322
- Battle of Ampfing (1800), during the French Revolutionary War
