= Jean Hardy =

French general (1762–1802)

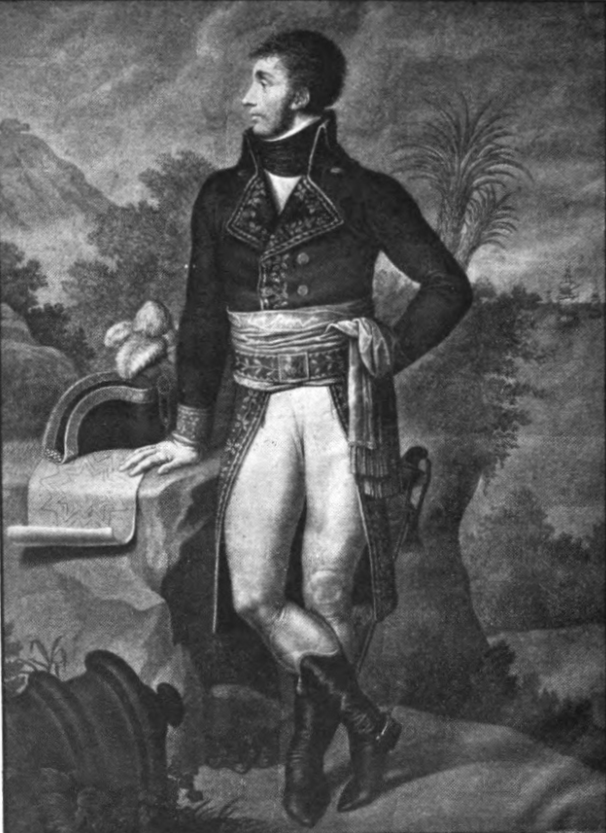
- Jean Hardy
- Born: 19 May 1762; Mouzon, Ardennes, France
- Died: 29 May 1802 (aged 40); Cap-Haïtien, Haiti
- Military career
- Allegiance: Kingdom of France; France
- Branch: Infantry
- Service years: 1783–1802
- Rank: General of Division
- Conflicts: War of the First Coalition; Battle of Valmy; Battle of Wattignies; Battle of Boussu; Battle of Grandreng; Battle of Gosselies; Battle of Fleurus; Siege of Maastricht; Rhine Campaign of 1795; Rhine Campaign of 1796; War of the Second Coalition; Battle of Tory Island; Battle of Ampfing; Haitian Revolution

Jean Hardy (19 May 1762 – 29 May 1802) commanded a French division during the French Revolutionary Wars. In 1783 he enlisted in the French Royal Army. In 1792 he joined a volunteer battalion and fought at Valmy, earning promotion to major. After leading a battalion at Wattignies and successfully holding Philippeville in 1793, he became a general of brigade. In 1794, he led troops in the Army of the Ardennes at Boussu-lez-Walcourt, Grandreng, Gosselies and Fleurus.

Hardy fought in the Army of Sambre-et-Meuse during the Rhine Campaign of 1795. He commanded 12,000 troops in the Rhine Campaign of 1796. In 1798 he was captured by the British at the Battle of Tory Island in a failed invasion of Ireland. In July 1799 Hardy was promoted general of division. He was wounded at Ampfing in late 1800. He was sent with the French expedition to put down the Haitian Revolution and died of yellow fever. His surname is one of the names inscribed under the Arc de Triomphe, on Column 6.

== War of the First Coalition ==
Hardy was born on 19 May 1762 in Mouzon, a village that is now in the Ardennes department of France. He enlisted in an infantry unit at age 21. At the time of the French Revolution, he was a fourrier in the Royal-Monsieur Regiment with the brevet rank of sous-officer. He joined the Epernay Volunteers and fought at the Battle of Valmy on 20 September 1792, earning promotion to Chef de bataillon (major). He became the commander of the 7th Battalion of the Marne Volunteers, leading his unit at the Battle of Wattignies on 17 October 1793. In the following month he was assigned to hold Philippeville against the Austrians and his vigorous defense was crowned with success. Hardy was promoted general of brigade on 16 November 1793.

Hardy was appointed commander of the advance guard of the Army of the Ardennes on 27 January 1794. This army was commanded by Louis Charbonnier. On 20 April, Charbonnier's superior Jean-Charles Pichegru ordered the Army of the Ardennes to march from Givet to Philippeville. By the 22nd, the army's 17,000 soldiers were massed west of Philippeville, less 3,450 men guarding the roads farther east. Philippe Joseph Jacob led 12 battalions grouped into a left brigade under Jean Thomas Guillaume Lorge and a right brigade under Jean Baptiste Augier. Hardy was assigned an advance force made up of the 26th Light Infantry Battalion, six companies of grenadiers, the 11th Chasseurs à Cheval Regiment and four light cannons. His task was to cover the army's march toward Beaumont. Charbonnier decided to cross the Silenrieux gorge on 25 April and seize Boussu-lez-Walcourt. Hardy's advance guard was reinforced with 172nd Line Infantry Demi-brigade, 1st Battalion of Sarthe, four companies of grenadiers, 20th Chasseurs à Cheval, one squadron of the 5th Dragoons and six field guns. Led by the grenadiers and light infantry, Hardy's troops crossed the Silenrieux ravine and took position on the west side.

The local Austrian commander Joseph Binder von Degenschild decided to counterattack on the 26th from Boussu, Walcourt and Florennes. Having received positive orders to attack Boussu on the 26th, Charbonnier further reinforced Hardy with the 2nd Battalion of Nord, 9th Battalion of Seine-et-Oise and two more field pieces. Hardy now commanded 6,000 foot soldiers, 800 horsemen, eight cannons and four howitzers. In the area between Boussu and Beaumont there were only 5,000 Coalition troops, including 1,000 cavalry. During the action of 26 April, Hardy was personally in command of the troops engaged at Boussu. At the end of the day, Degenschild withdrew his Coalition forces to Thuin and Marchienne-au-Pont.

Hardy led the advance guard in the capture of Thuin on 10 May in the lead-up to the Battle of Grandreng. On 3 June 1794, during the retreat after the Battle of Gosselies, Hardy with two battalions of light infantry defended the river crossing at Monceau-sur-Sambre. Under a crossfire of Austrian artillery, he and his troops held their ground until Alexandre-Antoine Hureau de Sénarmont and his engineers removed the last part of the pontoon bridge. During the Battle of Fleurus he led the advance guard in François Séverin Marceau-Desgraviers' division.

In the Rhine Campaign of 1795 Hardy commanded one of two brigades in Marceau's division which besieged Ehrenbreitstein Fortress. The units in his brigade were unspecified but the 11,240-strong division consisted of the 1st, 9th, 21st, 26th and 178th Line Infantry Demi-brigades, the 11th Chasseurs à Cheval and the 31st Gendarmes Battalion. The siege lasted from 15 September to 17 October 1795 and was unsuccessful. In July during the Rhine Campaign of 1796, Marceau was left to besiege Mainz with the 28,545 troops of the Right Wing and Infantry Reserve. Meanwhile, Jean-Baptiste Jourdan took the bulk of the Army of Sambre-et-Meuse into Germany in pursuit of the Austrian armies. Hardy's troops repulsed a sortie by the garrison of Mainz and he was cited in the order of the day for 29 July 1796. He commanded 12,000 troops on the west bank of the Rhine facing Mainz.

By September 1796, Jourdan's army was in retreat and Marceau was compelled to lift the siege of Mainz with his east bank forces and join Jourdan. At this time, Hardy withdrew his west bank division to the Nahe River. Later, he fought several skirmishes in the Hunsrück region, including at Ingelheim am Rhein, Bingen am Rhein and Kaiserslautern. On 27 November 1796 he was badly wounded at Mont-Tonnerre. After recuperating at Philippeville, Hardy married the 20-year-old Calixte Hufty de Busnel, Sénarmont's sister-in-law, on 18 January 1797. The couple had three sons, Victor, Felix and Édouard. The new commander of the Army of Sambre-et-Meuse, Lazare Hoche crossed the Rhine in April and Hardy rejoined the army. His private letters beginning on 30 April 1797 are preserved in a book edited by his grandson, General Hardy de Périni.

== War of the Second Coalition ==
On 16 December 1797, Jacques Maurice Hatry took command of the Army of Mainz which consisted of five infantry divisions under Hardy, François Joseph Lefebvre, Paul Grenier, Jean Étienne Championnet and Jean Baptiste Olivier and a cavalry division under Michel Ney. At the time Hardy's division was stationed at Koblenz. By a secret clause of the Treaty of Campo Formio, the Austrians agreed that the city of Mainz, which belonged to the Elector of Mainz, was to be handed over to France. Accordingly, Hatry immediately assembled his divisions before the city and demanded its surrender. The city capitulated on 30 December. Soon after, the divisions of Hardy and Ney were reassigned to the Army of England. In the spring of 1798 he was called to Lille to command a division. The Army of England briefly reached a strength of 100,000 men but by September 1798 its numbers had fallen to 30,000. On 2 June Hardy was at Colmar in Haut-Rhin department.

Map of Ireland and Tory Island

To support the Irish Rebellion of 1798 the French sent a naval expedition to Ireland that landed 1,099 soldiers under Jean Joseph Amable Humbert in August 1798. Unaware that Humbert was forced to surrender on 8 September, a second force of 2,844 troops under Hardy left for Ireland on 16 September. The naval squadron led by Jean-Baptiste-François Bompart was intercepted in the Battle of Tory Island and almost all of its ships captured, Hardy and most of his men becoming prisoners. He was exchanged in time to join the Army of the Danube in March 1799, but he was ill at the time and did not stay with the army long. Hardy assumed the rank of general of division on 30 July 1799. He was a friend of André Masséna and knew what was happening at his headquarters even though Hardy was not there. During the summer, the French Directory planned to replace Masséna as leader of the Army of the Danube but later decided to confirm him as commander. On 9 September Hardy wrote that Masséna was surprised at the decision.

After fighting in the spring and summer of 1800, the French army of Jean Victor Marie Moreau and Austrian army of Paul Kray signed an armistice on 15 July. On 12 November 1800, the French notified the Austrians that hostilities would start in 15 days. By this time, Moreau's army numbered 107,469 men and was flanked on the left by a 16,260-strong Franco-Dutch army and on the right by 18,602 French soldiers in Switzerland. Most of these troops were veterans led by experienced officers and operating in well-organized and well-equipped formations. Hardy wrote his wife, "The army is superb... this time it is certain that we will not sheath our sword until peace is signed." Unlike the usual French practice of having the soldiers live off the land, each division was trailed by a wagon train with seven days of food. Grenier's Left Wing consisted of three divisions, the 1st under Claude Juste Alexandre Legrand, the 2nd led by Ney and the 3rd commanded by Hardy. The 6,315-strong 3rd Division was made up of three battalions each of the 53rd and 89th Line Infantry Demi-brigades, three squadrons each of the 13th and 17th Cavalry Regiments and four squadrons each of the 2nd Dragoon and 23rd Chasseurs à Cheval Regiments. The division's 16 field pieces were manned by the 2nd Company of the 7th Horse Artillery, 4th Company of the 8th Horse Artillery and 15th Company of the 5th Foot Artillery.

Even though outnumbered in the theater, the Austrian army under Archduke John and Franz von Lauer launched an offensive. The Austrian military system soon proved unable to meet expectations, yet the generals managed to bring superior forces to bear. On the morning of 1 December 1800, the Austrians surprised the divisions of Ney and Hardy in their camps to start the Battle of Ampfing. Despite stubborn fighting, Ney's division was pushed back by the Austrian corps of Louis-Willibrod-Antoine Baillet de Latour. Hardy's badly outnumbered division was set upon by Johann Sigismund Riesch's corps. Though some troops from Legrand's division blocked one of Riesch's units, his left flank was slowly forced back. During the fighting, a shellburst killed one of his staff officers and sent a splinter into Hardy's hand. He handed over command of the division to Louis Bastoul. Grenier issued orders to withdraw during which the 2nd Dragoons distinguished themselves. At Ampfing, the French sustained losses of 193 killed, 817 wounded and 697 captured. Hardy wrote his wife that his troops had fought like lions. The archduke and his chief of staff Franz von Weyrother were excited at forcing their opponents to retreat. The Austrian losses of 303 killed, 1,690 wounded and 1,077 prisoners should have sobered them. Instead they became overconfident which led to disaster at the Battle of Hohenlinden two days later.

== Saint-Domingue Expedition ==
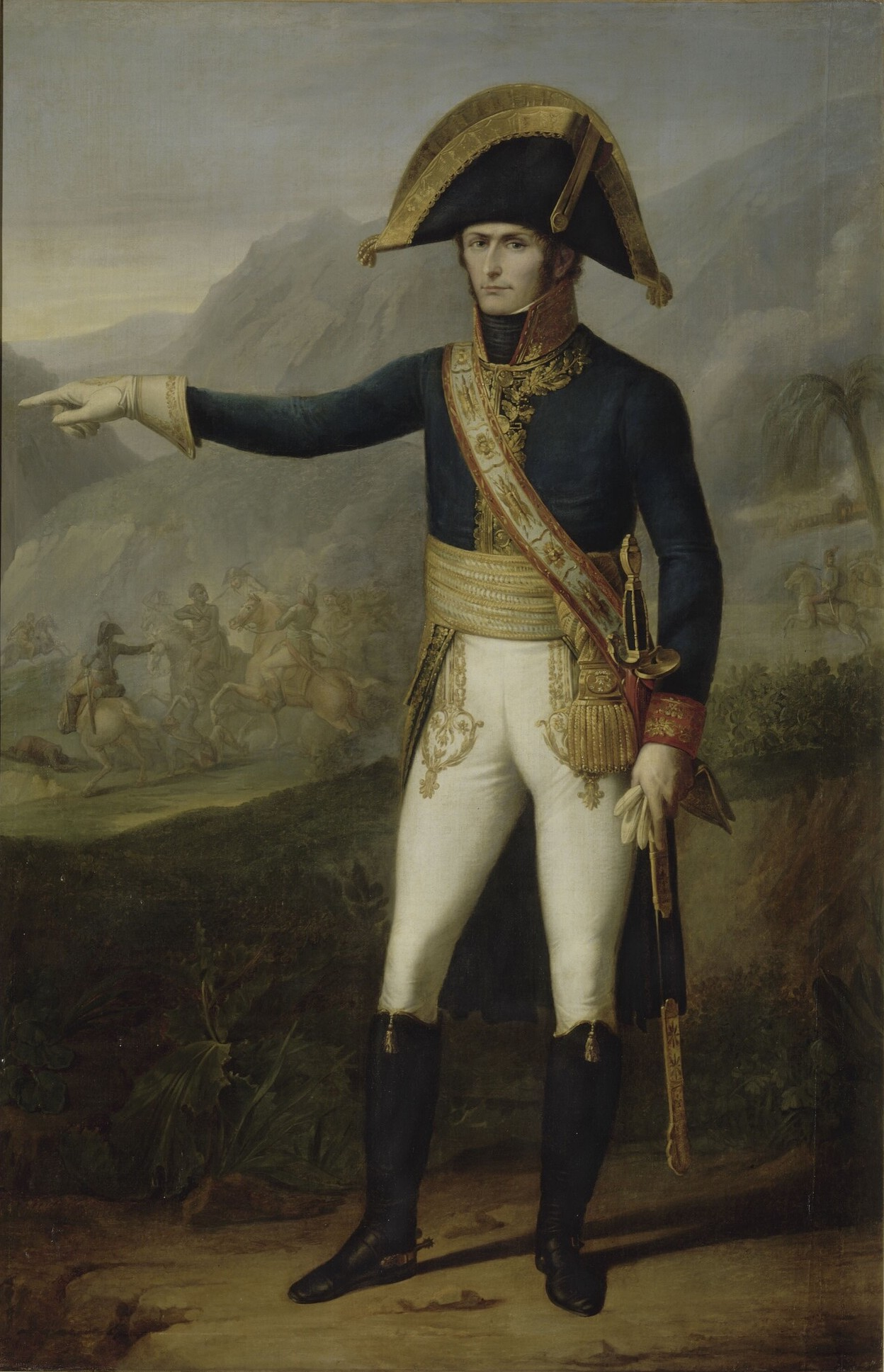
Charles Leclerc

Toussaint Louverture led a successful slave revolt that established control over Hispaniola with himself as governor general for life. Though Louverture pledged loyalty to France, Napoleon Bonaparte sent Charles Leclerc with 20,000 soldiers to reconquer the island. The expedition sailed from Brest on 14 December 1801 and landed in Haiti in February. Hardy was assigned to the expedition. Before he left France he noted in a letter to his wife that Napoleon persuaded his sister Pauline Bonaparte to accompany her husband Leclerc on the expedition. Hardy did not want Calixte to join him because of the dangers of the ocean passage, the war, the climate and yellow fever. The naval squadron reached Cap-Français (Cap-Haïtien) on 4 February 1802. Leclerc organized his army with Charles Dugua as his chief of staff, Jean-François Joseph Debelle as commander of artillery and engineers, and infantry divisions under Hardy, Jean Boudet, Donatien-Marie-Joseph de Rochambeau and Edme Étienne Borne Desfourneaux.

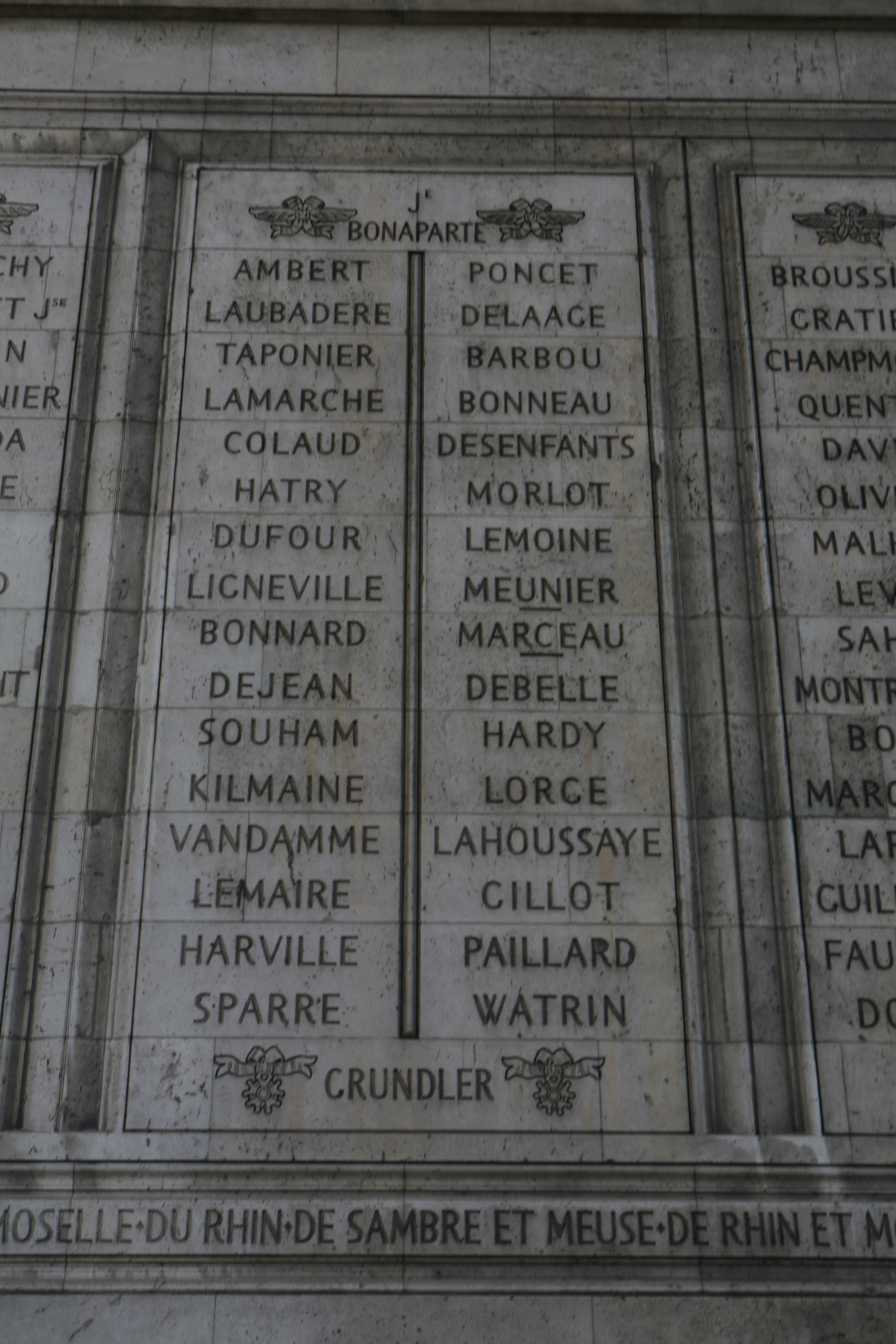
HARDY is on Column 6.

The divisions of Hardy and Desfourneaux disembarked on the west side of Cap-Français on 5 February after Louverture's general Henri Christophe refused to let them land in the port. In this first operation Hardy led the advance guard which drove off several hundred Haitian soldiers and captured six cannons. He arrived at Cap-Français to find the town in flames. The French seized the coastal towns, forcing Louverture to withdraw into the interior. Leclerc planned to have the divisions of Hardy, Desfourneaux and Rochambeau sweep south from Cap-Français while Boudet was to move north from Port-au-Prince. Humbert's brigade led by Debelle would move in from a different direction. On 18 February the French columns advanced, with Desfourneaux on the right, Hardy in the center and Rochambeau on the left. Debelle landed at Port-de-Paix and moved south-east. Leclerc rode with Hardy's column which saw fighting at Marmelade. Hardy took Jean-Baptiste Salme's brigade on an all-night march and stormed Bayonnais at dawn. Meanwhile, Rochambeau's division experienced heavy fighting in the Battle of Ravine-à-Couleuvres. At one point a large body of Louverture's army was surrounded but it managed to slip away from the French. Hardy returned to Cap-Français at the end of the operation.

On 31 March, Hardy assumed command of his own and Desfourneaux's divisions at Cap-Français. Bertrand Clausel took over from Desfourneaux who was ill and Salme succeeded to the command of Hardy's division. Hardy's chief adversary was Christophe, perhaps the best of Louverture's generals. On 20 April Hardy wrote to Christophe, pointing out that several of Louverture's lieutenants had defected to the French and urging him to do the same. Christophe responded politely but he and his troops did not give up. By May Hardy pacified the northern region and established a civil administration. He wrote affectionately to his wife on 17 May about the recent birth of their third son, saying that he was in good health. On 27 May 1802 he was stricken with yellow fever and died within a few hours. Another source asserted that Hardy died on 29 May. The fever killed most of the French army, including generals Leclerc, Debelle and Dugua. The Haitian armies, apparently on the verge of giving up, continued the war with renewed resolve. On 28 November 1803 Rochambeau surrendered 3,000 disease-ridden French survivors to a British force at Cap-Français. The last 1,200 French troops handed over Santo Domingo on 15 July 1809. HARDY is on Column 6 of the Arc de Triomphe. (Note: See photo that shows Columns 5 and 6 of the Arc de Triomphe.)

== Notes ==
Footnotes

Citations
