= Battle of Ampfing (1800) =

Part of the French Revolutionary War

- Part of the French Revolutionary War
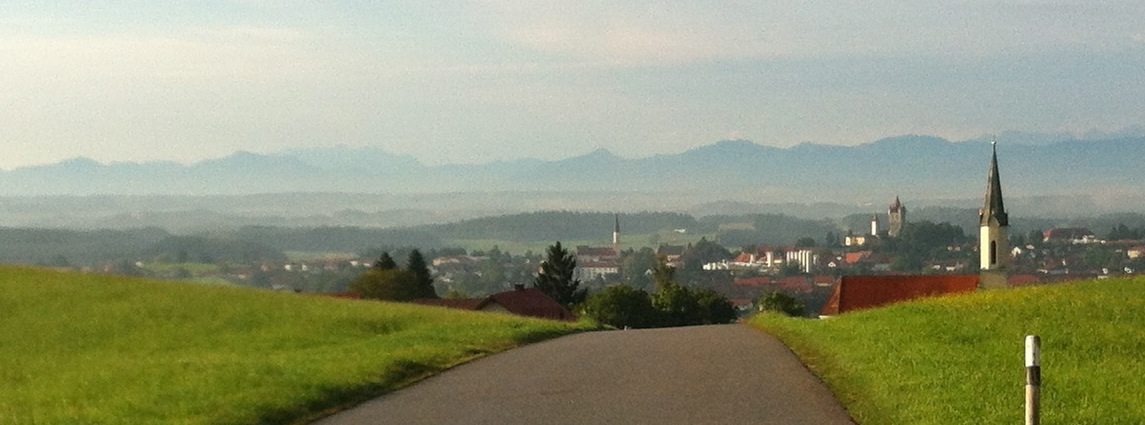
- The hilly terrain around Ampfing is characterized by open fields, dense woods, and villages and farms.
Date	1 December 1800
Location	Ampfing, Bavaria, modern-day Germany 48°16′N 12°25′E
Result	See Result

Belligerents
(French First Republic) French Republic	(Habsburg monarchy) Habsburg Austria

Commanders and leaders
Paul Grenier	Archduke John of Austria

Strength
18,000	27,000

Casualties and losses
1,707	3,070

War of the Second Coalition:
Austria
The color black indicates the current battle.

At the Battle of Ampfing on 1 December 1800, Paul Grenier's two divisions of the French First Republic opposed the Austrian army southwest of the town of Ampfing during the French Revolutionary Wars. The Austrians, under the leadership of Archduke John of Austria, forced their enemies to retreat, though they sustained greater losses than the French. Ampfing is located 63 kilometers (39 miles) east of Munich and 8 km (5.0 mi) west of Mühldorf am Inn.

In Spring 1800, while Moreau wrecked Austrian defenses in Germany, Generals Massena and Desaix ran into stiff Austrian offensives in Northern Italy. In June, Napoleon brought in the reserve corps and defeated the Austrians at Marengo. On the Danube, the decisive Battle of Höchstädt, followed by success at Battle of Neuburg a few days later, allowed the French to take Munich and to control the Danube and its tributaries as far as Ingolstadt. With the French pressing on Austria from the north and through Italy, a truce ended hostilities for the rest of the summer. Despite these significant losses—both of them decisive—the Austrians were reluctant to accept disadvantageous peace terms. After the expiration of the summer truce in November 1800, both the Austrian and French armies rushed to come to grips with each other in the terrain east of Munich. The newly appointed commander of Austrian forces, Archduke John, managed to bring the bulk of his army against Grenier's left wing of Jean Moreau's French army near Ampfing. Outnumbered, two French divisions fought a stubborn rear guard action for six hours before retreating in good order.

Instead of being sobered by their 3,000 casualties, Archduke John and his staff became convinced that the enemy was on the run. The Austrian general ordered a pursuit of the French through forested terrain. But, instead of fleeing, Moreau and his troops were waiting for the Austrians. The two armies met in the decisive Battle of Hohenlinden two days later.

== Background ==
Although the First Coalition forces achieved several initial victories, the efforts of Napoleon Bonaparte in northern Italy pushed Austrian forces back and resulted in the negotiation of the Peace of Leoben (17 April 1797) and the subsequent Treaty of Campo Formio (October 1797). This treaty proved difficult to administer. Austria was slow to give up some of the Venetian territories. A Congress convened at Rastatt for the purposes of deciding which southwestern German states would be mediatized to compensate the dynastic houses for territorial losses, but was unable to make any progress. Supported by French republican forces, Swiss insurgents staged several uprisings, ultimately causing the overthrow of the Swiss Confederation after 18 months of civil war. By early 1799, the French Directory had become impatient with stalling tactics employed by Austria. The uprising in Naples raised further alarms, and recent gains in Switzerland suggested the timing was fortuitous to venture on another campaign in northern Italy and southwestern Germany.

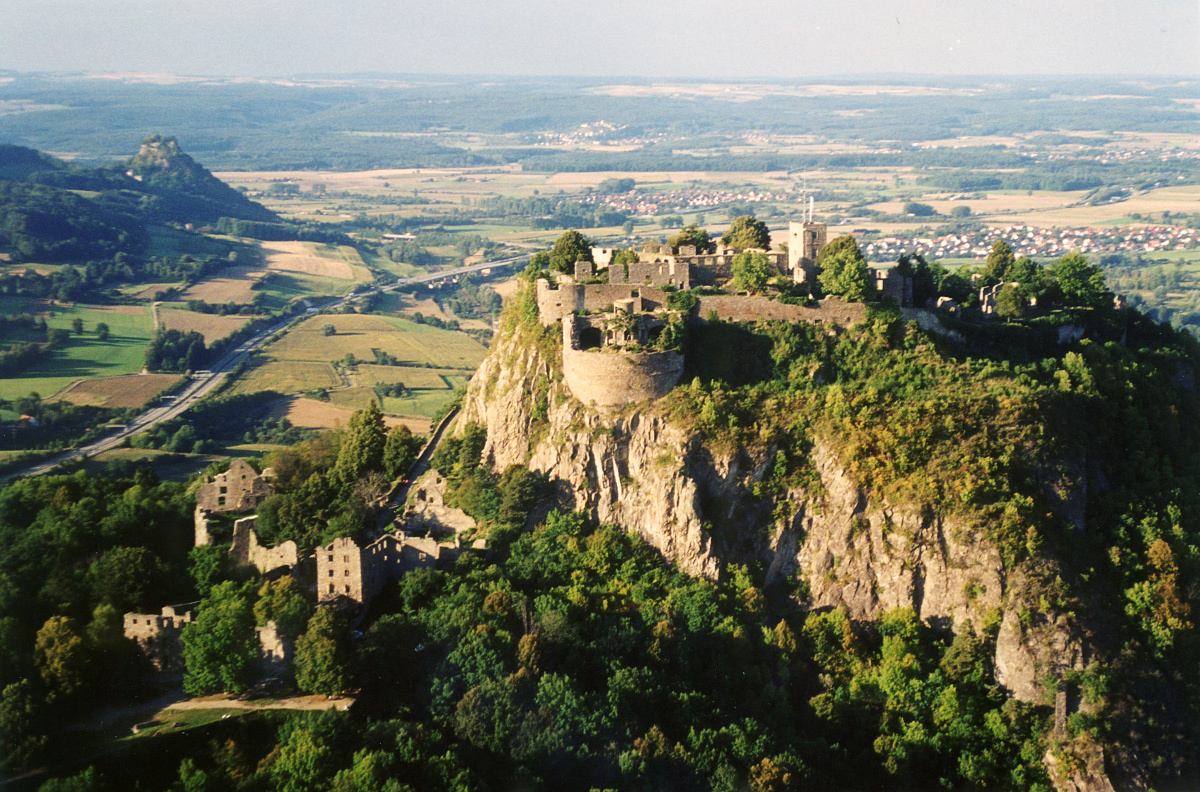
The Battles of Stockach and Engen in May 1800, followed by a larger battle at Meßkirch, followed the Hohentwiel's capitulation to the French

At the beginning of 1800, the armies of France and Austria faced each other across the Rhine. Pál Kray led approximately 120,000 troops. In addition to his Austrian regulars, his force included 12,000 men from the Electorate of Bavaria, 6,000 troops from the Duchy of Württemberg, 5,000 soldiers of low quality from the Archbishopric of Mainz, and 7,000 militiamen from the County of Tyrol. Of these, 25,000 men were deployed east of Lake Constance (Bodensee) to protect the Vorarlberg. Kray posted his main body of 95,000 soldiers in the L-shaped angle where the Rhine changes direction from a westward flow along the northern border of Switzerland to a northward flow along the eastern border of France. Unwisely, Kray set up his main magazine at Stockach, near the northwestern end of Lake Constance, only a day's march from French-held Switzerland.

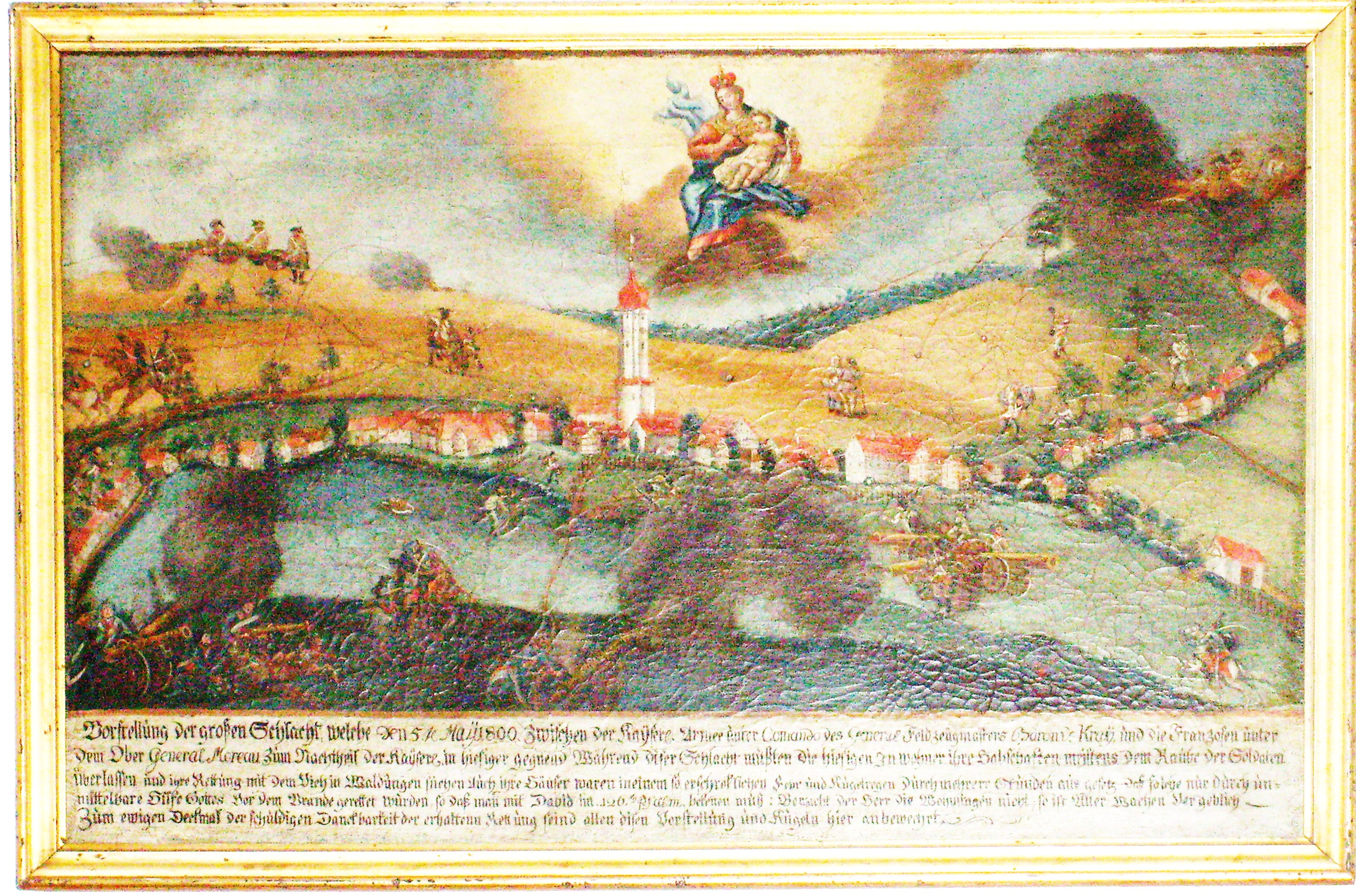
The Battle of Meßkirch was won from the high ground.

Jean Victor Marie Moreau commanded a modestly-equipped army of 137,000 French troops. Of these, 108,000 troops were available for field operations while the other 29,000 watched the Swiss border and held the Rhine fortresses. First Consul Napoleon Bonaparte offered a plan of operations based on outflanking the Austrians by a push from Switzerland, but Moreau declined to follow it. Rather, Moreau planned to cross the Rhine near Basel where the river swung to the north. A French column would distract Kray from Moreau's true intentions by crossing the Rhine from the west. Bonaparte wanted Claude Lecourbe's corps to be sent to Italy after the initial battles on the Danube plain, but Moreau had other plans. Through a series of complicated maneuvers in which he flanked, double flanked, and reflanked Kray's army, Moreau's army lay on the eastern slope of the Black Forest, while portions of Kray's army still guarded the passes on the other side. Battles at Engen and Stockach were fought on 3 May 1800 between the army of the First French Republic under Jean Victor Marie Moreau and the army of Habsburg Austria led by Pál Kray. The fighting near Engen resulted in a stalemate with heavy losses on both sides. However, while the two main armies were engaged at Engen, Claude Lecourbe captured Stockach from its Austrian defenders under Joseph Louis, Prince of Lorraine-Vaudémont. The loss of this main supply base at Stockach compelled Kray to retreat to Meßkirch, where they enjoyed a more favorable defensive position. It also meant, however, that any retreat by Kray into Austria via Switzerland and the Voralberg was cut off.

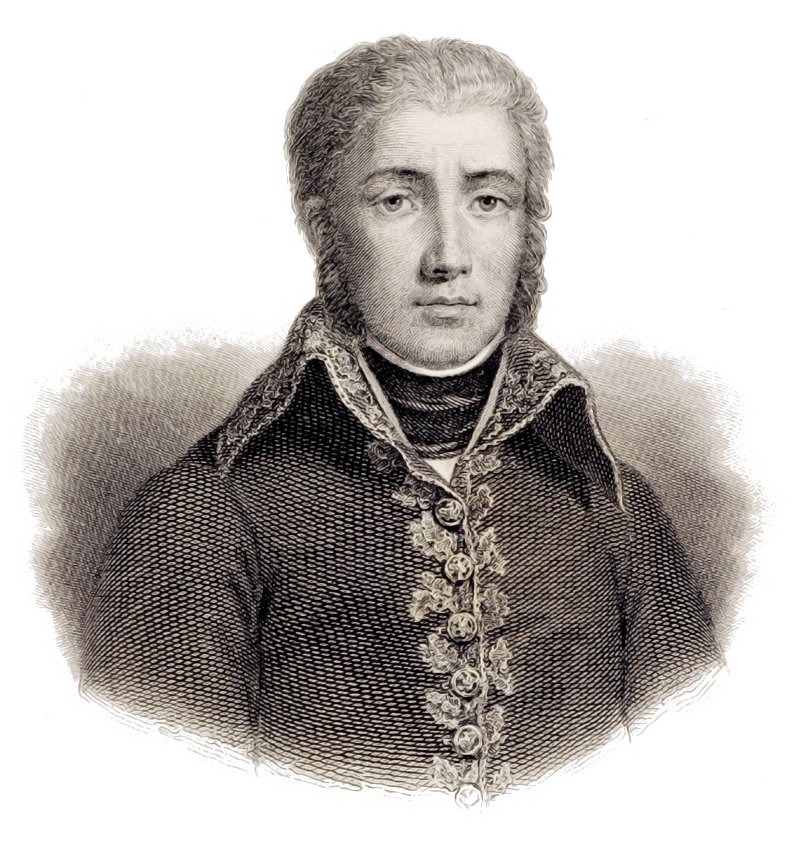
Jean Victor Moreau commanded the French Army of the Rhine.

On 4 and 5 May, the French launched repeated and fruitless assaults on the Meßkirch. At nearby Krumbach, where the Austrians also had the superiority of position and force, the 1st Demi-brigade took the village and the heights around it, which gave them a commanding aspect over Meßkirch. Subsequently, Kray withdrew his forces to Sigmaringen, followed closely by the French. Fighting at nearby Biberach ensued on 9 May; action principally consisted of the 25,000 man-strong French center's (commanded by Laurent de Gouvion Saint-Cyr), assault on the Austrian force. Again, on 10 May, the Austrians withdrew with heavy losses, this time to Ulm.

=== Strategic importance of Danube valley ===
The French war goal, to occupy Vienna and force the Habsburgs to accept and comply with peace terms established in 1798, required a double-pronged invasion through northern Italy, which First Consul Napoleon commanded, and through southern Germany, a campaign that fell to Moreau. To secure access into Bavaria and, eventually, to Vienna, the French needed to control the Danube riverway. This was not a new tactic: this stretch of the river had been the site of major battles of the Thirty Years War and War of Spanish Succession. Between Ulm and Ingolstadt, the Danube grows significantly in volume, making it a wide and swift waterway. The Iller joins the Danube at Ulm, dumping massive amounts of water into the stream; at Donauwörth, the Lech enters the Danube. Neuburg, the first significant city on the river after Donauwörth, had been the family seat of the princes of Pfalz-Neuburg; taking it from a princely family of the Holy Roman Empire would be a blow to the morale and prestige of the Habsburgs, whose role it was to protect the small princely domains. Control of the bridges and passages between Ulm and Donauwörth, Neuburg, then Ingolstadt offered an advantage of both transport and prestige. There followed a series of battles and clashes along the Danube between Ulm and Ingolstadt. Once Höchstädt and its nearby bridges fell on 19 June, the French controlled the Danube crossings between Ulm and Donauwörth. Kray abandoned Ulm, and withdrew further downstream. The next French target would be Neuburg. After a day-long battle for control of the river by Neuburg, the Austrians withdrew. Lecourbe ordered his troops not to pursue, as nightfall was on them. The French now controlled access to the Danube, its tributaries as far south as Pöttmes, and the banks on the north side of the river.

The loss of Neuburg broke the Austrian control along the strategic Danube. Similarly, in Italy, French successes at the battles at Montebello and Marengo forced Austrian withdrawal to the east. With France threatening Habsburg Austria from the northwest and southwest, the Austrians agreed to a cease fire. Subsequent peace negotiations were complicated by the alliance Austria had made with Britain, and which prevented her from signing any separate peace. Consequently, the British, although they had been successful in blockading French ports, entered the negotiations to bolster their weakened ally. Initially Britain refused the French terms and offered counter terms in September 1800. Negotiations continued; Napoleon later claimed that the Austrians did not negotiate in good faith, and sought only to gain time until "the rainy season" (winter), when army movements would be difficult, and the Habsburgs would have an entire season to recruit.

=== Truce ===
On 15 July 1800, France and Austria agreed to a truce that ended the summer campaign in southern Germany. Emperor Francis II dismissed Pál Kray and appointed his brother, the 18-year-old Archduke John, to command the Austrian army. To compensate for the young man's inexperience, the emperor named Franz von Lauer as deputy commander and Oberst (Colonel) Franz von Weyrother became Chief of Staff. Both armies prepared for a renewal of hostilities, but an extension of the truce was signed on 20 September. At this time, the Bavarian fortresses of Ingolstadt, Ulm, and Philippsburg were ceded to the French, but these concessions allowed Austria to augment their field forces with 20,000 line infantry belonging to the garrisons. In the meantime, peace negotiations were continued.

=== Resumption of hostilities ===
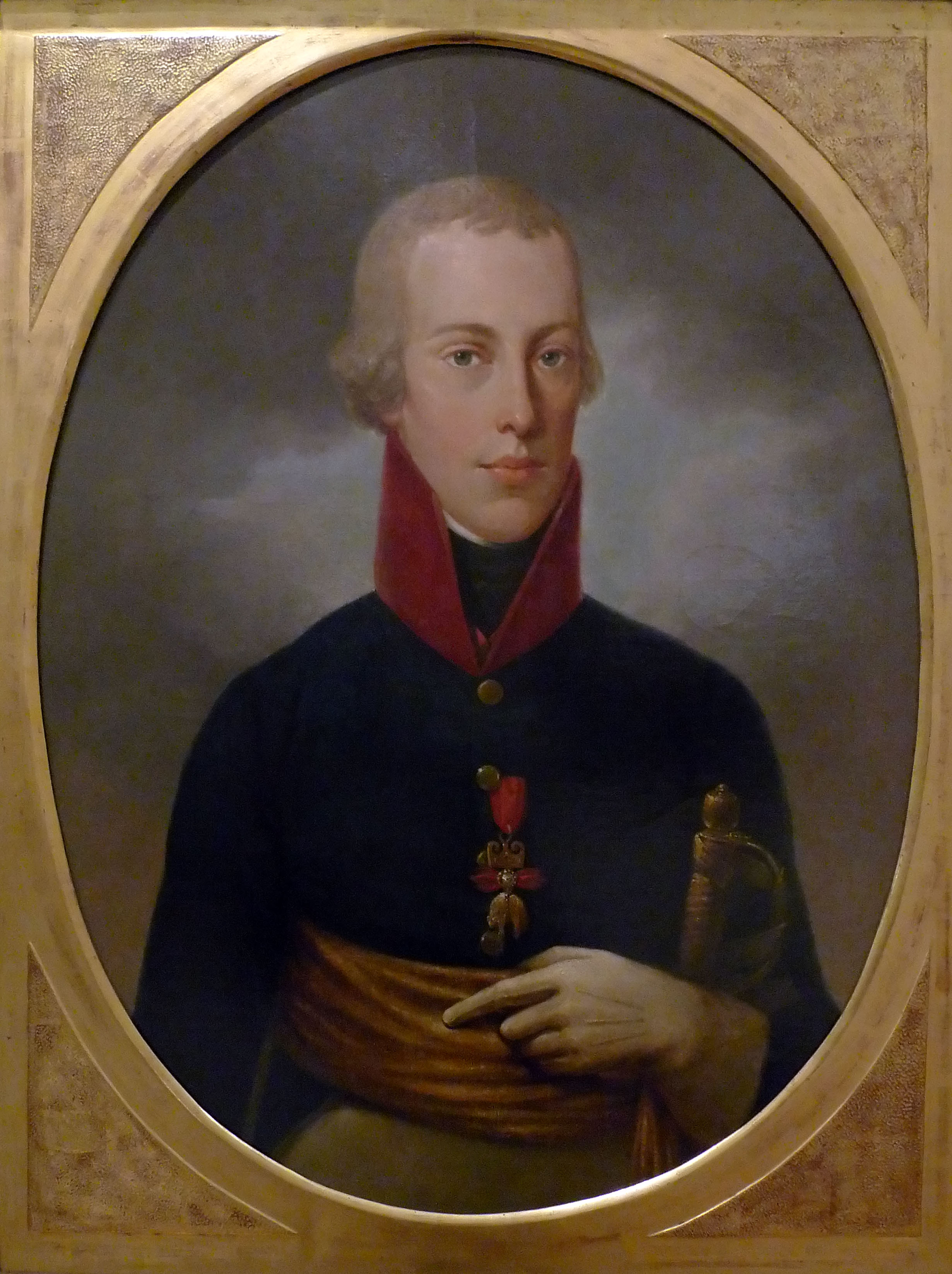
Archduke John in 1800

The summer armistice held until 12 November 1800, when the French notified their enemies of their intention to end the truce in two weeks. The Austrians distributed 124,000 soldiers in an arc from Würzburg in the north to Innsbruck in the south. Joseph-Sebastien von Simbschen held Würzburg with 12,000 troops. Johann von Klenau and 14,000 soldiers defended the north bank of the Danube near Regensburg. Archduke John's main army, with 49,000 infantry and 16,500 cavalry, lay behind the Inn River near Braunau am Inn and Passau. Christian von Zweibrücken's 16,000 Bavarians, Württembergers, Austrians, and French Émigrés of the Army of Condé lay to the southwest of the main army, guarding the line of the Inn. Farther to the southwest, Johann von Hiller occupied Innsbruck with 16,000 troops.

To counter the Austrians, the French fielded an even larger array of forces. From Frankfurt am Main, Pierre Augereau and 16,000 troops threatened Simbschen's northern wing. Moreau controlled 107,000 of the main army, deployed in four wings. Bruneteau de Saint-Suzanne's 24,000-strong detached force occupied the north bank of the Danube near Ingolstadt, Grenier's 24,000-man Left Wing deployed on the west bank of the Isar River near Landshut. Moreau massed the 36,000 soldiers of the Center around Munich under his personal control. The Right Wing of Lecourbe defended the line of the upper Lech River farther west. Lastly, Jacques MacDonald with the 18,000-strong Army of the Grisons threatened Hiller's force from Switzerland.

Unlike most French armies of the Revolutionary period, Moreau's troops in late 1800 enjoyed a well-organized supply service. Though the onset of winter lengthened the army sick list, the months-long truce allowed many units to approach their full strength. Many French officers were confident of success. Moreau planned a broad-front advance eastward to the Inn, fighting any enemies as he found them. He would lead with his left to allow Lecourbe's Right Wing to advance unmolested, since it had a greater distance to cover. Once the French wings closed up to the Inn River, his troops would look for crossing sites.

The aggressive Weyrother persuaded Archduke John and Lauer to launch an offensive. The Austrian chief of staff planned to strike in the direction of Landshut. From there, the Austrians would either wheel left to smash the French left flank or possibly get across their enemies' line of communications to the west of Munich. However, in the last days of November, the Austrian army proved unable to advance with the necessary speed to turn the French north flank. Aware that their adversaries were also advancing, Lauer convinced the archduke to convert the flank march into a direct advance on Munich.

== Battle ==
By the evening of 30 November, the Austrian advance guard occupied Ampfing. At dawn on 1 December, Johann Riesch left the town with 12 battalions of infantry and 12 squadrons of cavalry, or approximately 14,000 men. Ludwig Baillet de Latour-Merlemont led nine battalions and 18 squadrons, or 12,000 soldiers, on Riesch's right flank. Latour quickly overran the French outposts and nearly surprised Michel Ney's division in its camp. Despite odds of four-to-one, the (French) 19th Cavalry Regiment charged their attackers, which included the Latour Dragoon Regiment # 11.

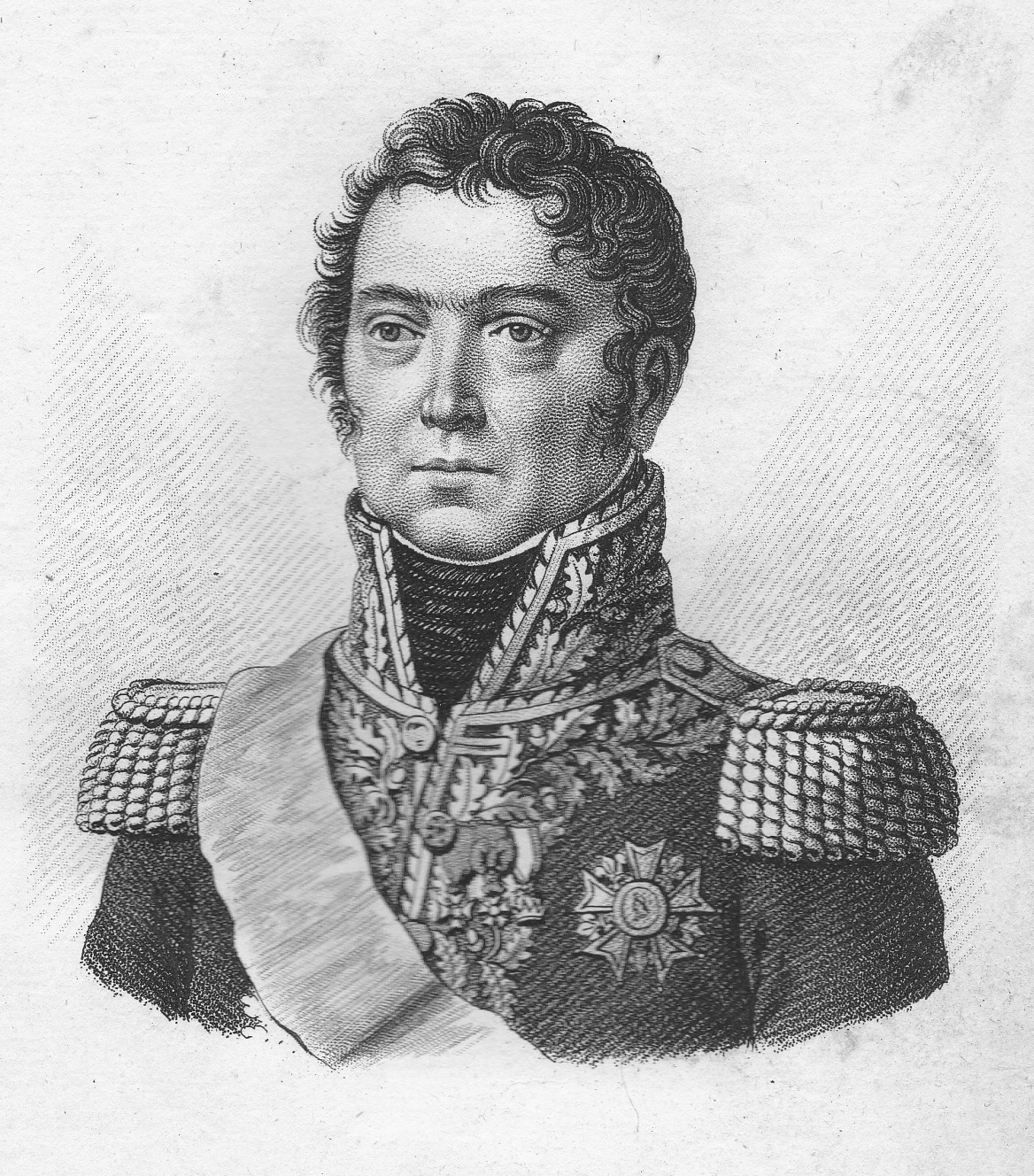
Paul Grenier

The cavalry charge gave Ney enough time to place the brigade commanded by Gabriel Adrien Marie Poissonnier Desperrières in line of battle to meet the first shock. Ney's division included 8,200 infantry, 1,100 cavalry, and 14 cannons, but one of his three brigades was detached to the south at Wasserburg am Inn. Desperrières conducted an able defense, counterattacking when the 13th Dragoons rode to his support. Meanwhile, Ney directed the fighting on a second brigade front. At noon, a horse artillery battery led by Jean Baptiste Eblé arrived and its accurate fire quickly dismounted four Austrian guns and destroyed three caissons. Later, two pieces were overrun by Austrian hussars, but the French gunners rallied and recaptured the pieces in a horseback charge.

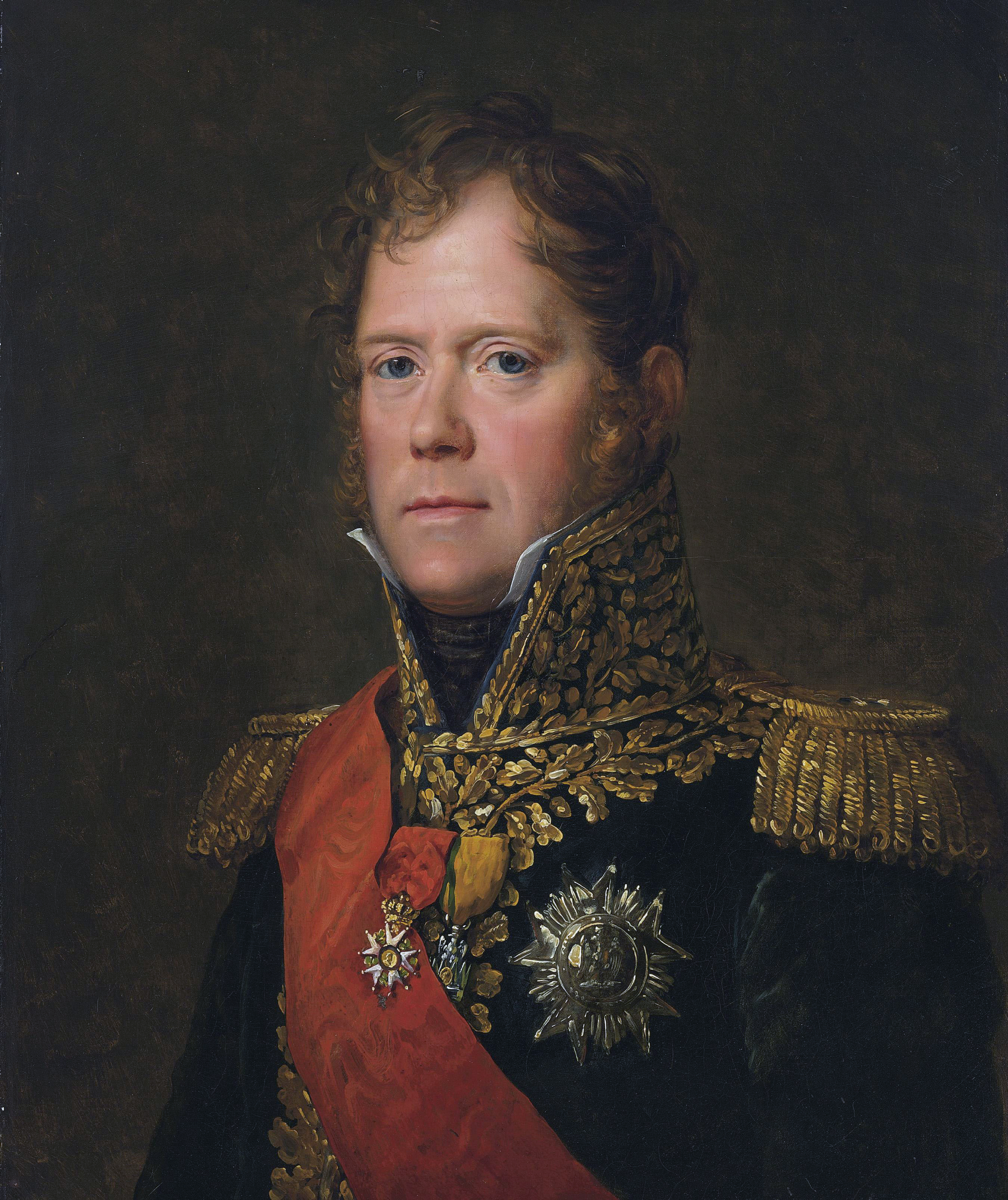
Michel Ney

While Latour battered against Ney, Riesch launched attacks against the 4,100 foot soldiers, 2,000 horsemen, and 16 guns belonging to Jean Hardy's division. A brigade belonging to Claude Legrand's division marched up and helped block Riesch's attempt to turn Hardy's flank. During the fighting, a shellburst wounded Hardy and caused him to hand over command to BG Bastoul. With both French divisions being slowly pressed back by superior numbers, Grenier gave orders for a withdrawal.

Grenier directed his well-managed retreat along the road toward Haag, with all the units falling back in an orderly echelon. To save some artillery from capture, the 2nd Dragoons charged their pursuers and captured 100 Austrians. After falling back 8 km (5.0 mi), the French soldiers reached the open ground around Haag, where they assumed a defensive position. All told, the battle lasted six hours. In addition to the Latour Dragoons, the most heavily engaged Austrian units were the Archduke Charles Infantry Regiment (IR) # 3 and the Waldeck Dragoons # 7 from Riesch's column, plus IR # 60 and the Vecsey Hussars # 4 from Johann Kollowrat's column.

== Result ==
The Austrians suffered 303 killed, 1,690 wounded, and 1,077 captured. The French lost 193 killed, 817 wounded, and 697 captured. Expecting to fight a major battle the following day, the Austrian generals were surprised to find that the French had evacuated Haag and vanished into the deep woods. Though Lauer counseled caution, the victory elated the inexperienced Archduke John, the aggressive Weyrother, and the army staff. They became convinced that they only faced French rear guards. "This erroneous idea prompted Austrian headquarters to ignore all normal precautions in the haste to come to grips [with the French force]." John ordered a pursuit toward Hohenlinden by the columns of Riesch, Latour, and Kollowrat, while drawing in FML Michael von Kienmayer's 16,000-strong column to form his northern flank. They chased after the French into the Ebersberg forest, but Moreau waited for the Austrian and Bavarian force in the Hohenlinden plain with four divisions and his cavalry reserve and ambushed them as they emerged from the forest. To complete the victory at Hohenlinden, MG Antoine Richepanse's division accomplished a surprise envelopment of the Austrian left flank.

This crushing victory, followed by several skirmishes and clashes along the Danube and in Bavaria, demoralized the Habsburg force. These, Coupled with First Consul Napoleon Bonaparte's victory at the Battle of Marengo on 14 June 1800, ended the War of the Second Coalition. In February 1801, the Austrians signed the Treaty of Lunéville, accepting French control up to the Rhine and the French puppet republics in Italy and the Netherlands. The subsequent Treaty of Amiens between France and Britain began the longest break in the wars of the Napoleonic period.

== Sources ==
- Arnold, James R. Marengo & Hohenlinden. Barnsley, South Yorkshire, UK: Pen & Sword, 2005. ISBN 978-0967098500
- Beattie, Andrew. The Danube: A Cultural History. Oxford University Press, 2010. ISBN 9780199768356
- Blanning, Timothy. The French Revolutionary Wars, New York, Oxford University Press. ISBN 978-0340569115
- Sloane, W.M. Life of Napoleon. France, 1896 (reprint, 1910).
- Pivka, Otto von (pseud). Armies of the Napoleonic Era. New York: Taplinger Publishing, 1979. ISBN 0-8008-5471-3
- Smith, Digby, Napoleonic Wars Databook. London: Greenhill Press, 1998.

=== External sources ===
- napoleon-series.org Ludwig Baillet by Digby Smith, compiled by Leopold Kudrna
