= Gabriel Poissonnier Desperrières =

French army officer (1763–1852)

Gabriel Adrien Marie Poissonnier Desperrières
- Born: 12 January 1763 13 mai 1852; Paris, Kingdom of France
- Died: 13 May 1852 (aged 89); Bayonne (Pyrénées-Atlantiques)
- Military career
- Allegiance: France
- Branch: Infantry
- Rank: Général de brigade
- Conflicts: War of the Second Coalition; Battle of Hohenlinden
- Awards: Legion of Honour; Order of Saint Louis

Gabriel Adrien Marie Poissonnier Desperrières (1763–1852) was a French military officer who rose to the rank of general during the French Revolution and the First French Empire.

In May 1800, his brigade, together with those of generals Bastoul and Walther, made up a division led by General de division Leclerc in the Army of the Rhine and Moselle.

In November 1800, Desperrières led a brigade made up of the 76th Line Demi-brigade and the 103rd Line Demi-brigade under Ney.

== See also ==
- List of French generals of the Revolutionary and Napoleonic Wars
