= Ampfing =

- Municipality
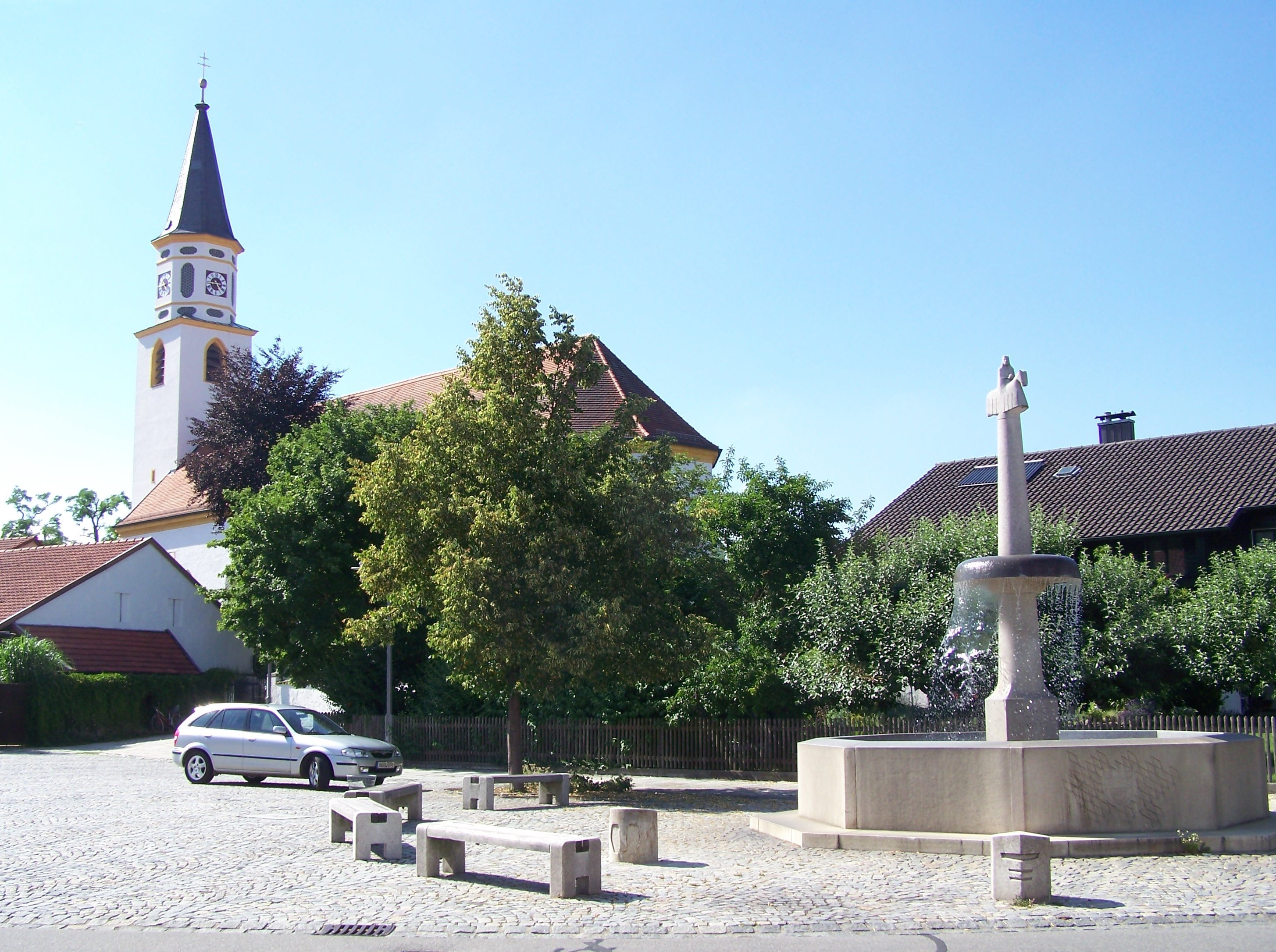
- Town square

- Coat of arms

- Location of Ampfing within Mühldorf district
- Interactive map of Ampfing
- Location within Germany Location within Bavaria
- Coordinates: 48°15′18″N 12°25′5″E
- Country: Germany
- State: Bavaria
- Admin. region: Upper Bavaria
- District: Mühldorf

Government
  - Mayor (2018–24): Josef Grundner

Area
  - Total: 31.14 km^{2} (12.02 sq mi)
- Elevation: 416 m (1,365 ft)

Population (2025-12-31)
  - Total: 7,197
  - Density: 231.1/km^{2} (598.6/sq mi)
- Time zone: UTC+01:00 (CET)
  - Summer (DST): UTC+02:00 (CEST)
- Postal codes: 84539
- Dialling codes: 08636
- Vehicle registration: MÜ
- Website: www.ampfing.de

Ampfing (German pronunciation: [ˈampfɪŋ]) is a municipality in the district of Mühldorf in Bavaria in Germany, and a name of a small town of the same name.

== History ==
The Battle of Mühldorf was fought on 28 September 1322 between Bavaria and Austria in Ampfing Heath. The Bavarians were led by Louis the Bavarian, while the Austrians were led by his cousin Frederick I of Austria. The battle did not go well for the Austrians; they were defeated, and more than 1000 noblemen from Austria and Salzburg were captured, as was Frederick himself.

The Battle of Ampfing (1800) took place on 1 December 1800 during the War of the Second Coalition.

It was one of the sub-camps of Dachau concentration camp.

== Geography ==
Ampfing is located in the region Southeast-Upper-Bavaria (Südostoberbayern) in the valley of river Isen.

== Politics ==
Josef Grundner (CSU) is head mayor.

Community tax yield amounted €5,581,000 (converted) in 1999, thereof trade tax yield €2,948,000 (net).

== Coat of arms ==
Divided into silver and blue; in the upper part two obliquely traversed flails, in the lower part a golden boring tool.

The town's flag shows the colours red and gold.

== Gallery ==
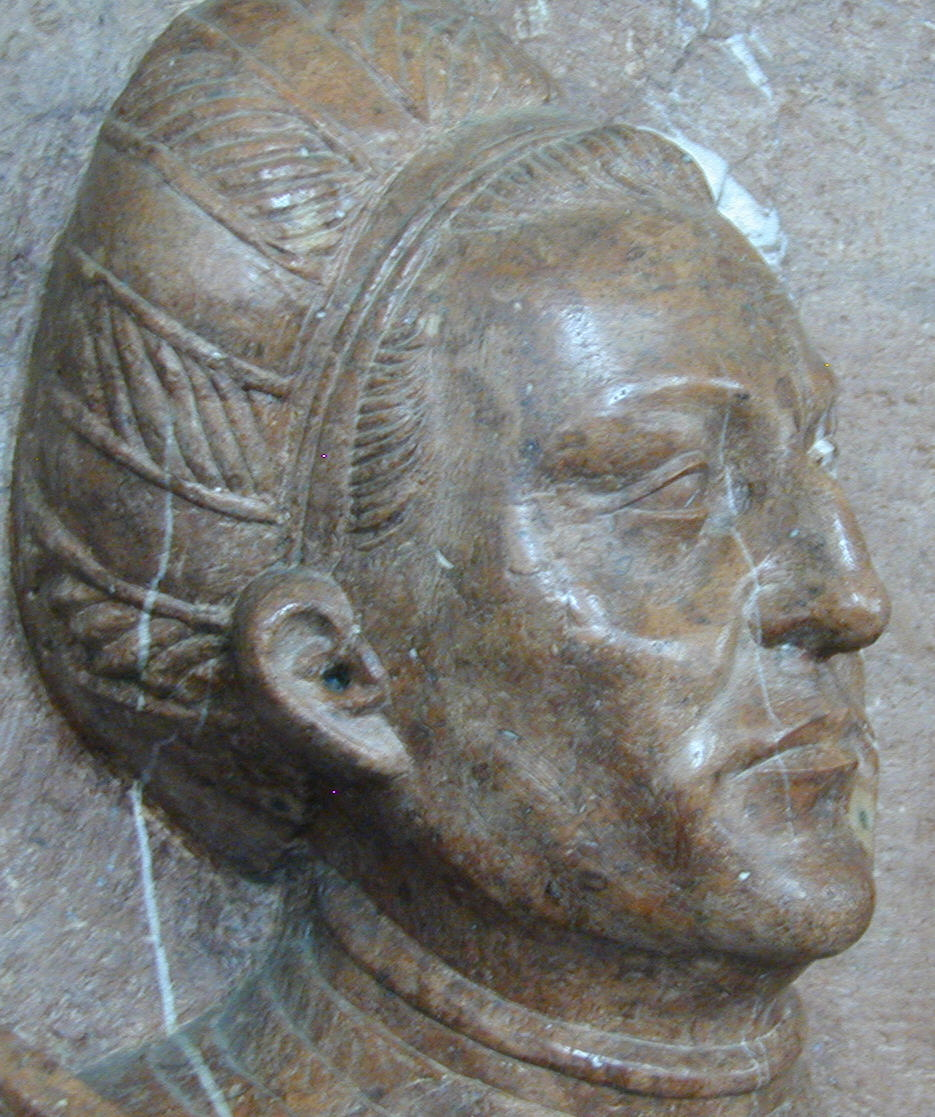
Degenhart Pfaffinger

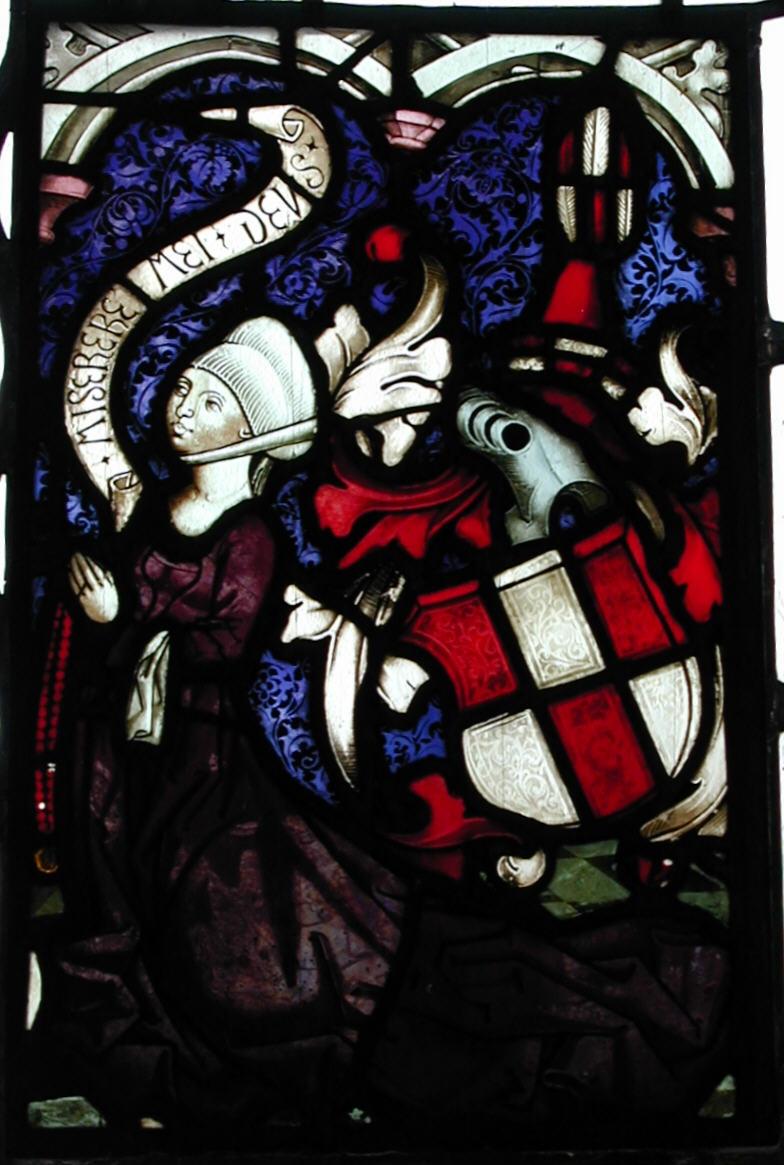
Anna Auer of Buolach, second wife of Gentiflor Pfaffinger

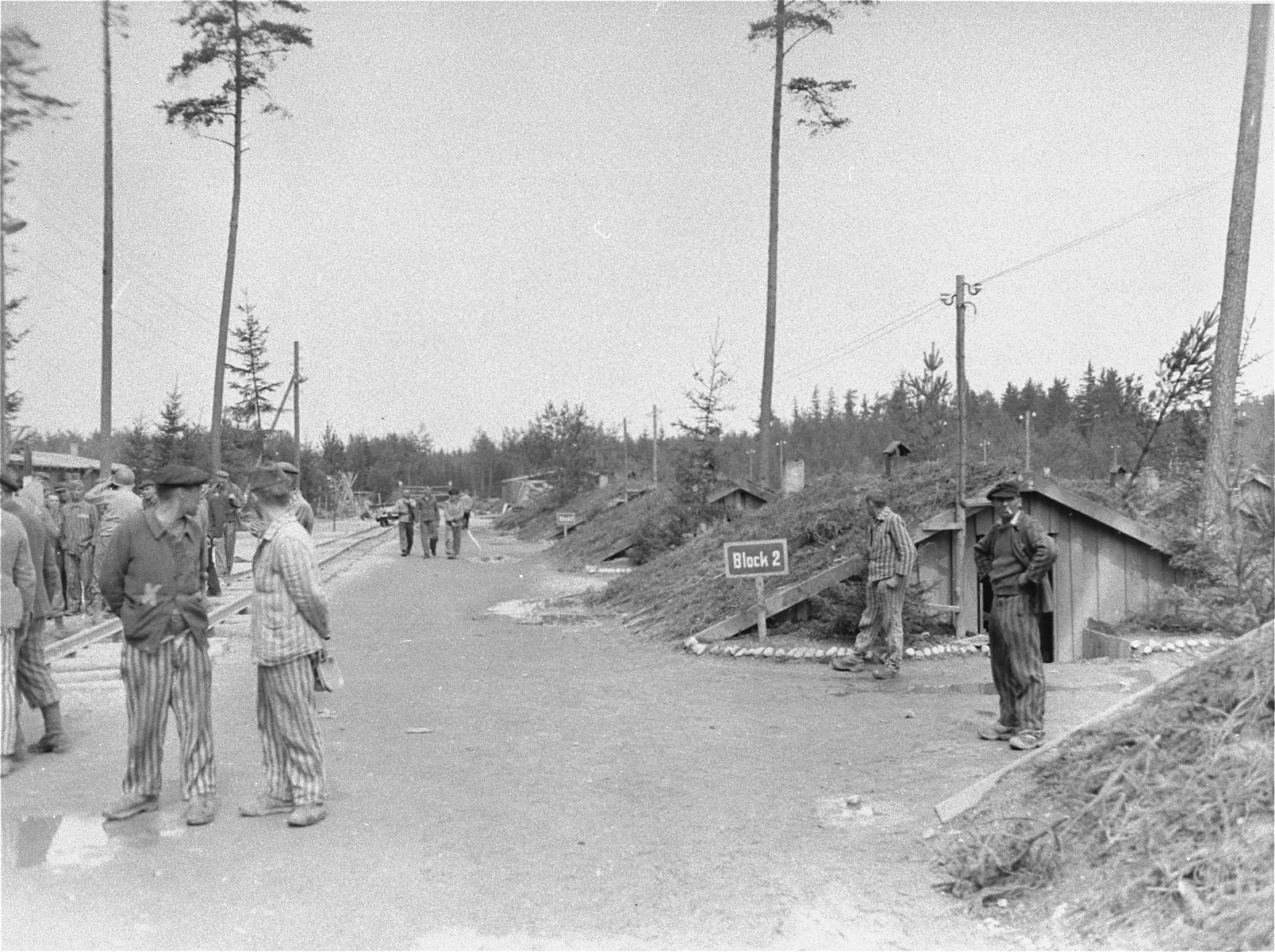
sub-concentration camp Mühldorf-Ampfing of KZ Dachau (Außenlager Mühldorf-Ampfing des KZ Dachau)
