= Hohenlinden =

- Municipality
- Coat of arms

- Location of Hohenlinden within Ebersberg district
- Interactive map of Hohenlinden
- Location within Germany Location within Bavaria
- Coordinates: 48°09′25″N 11°59′52″E
- Country: Germany
- State: Bavaria
- Admin. region: Oberbayern
- District: Ebersberg

Government
  - Mayor (2020–26): Ludwig Maurer

Area
  - Total: 17.32 km^{2} (6.69 sq mi)
- Elevation: 540 m (1,770 ft)

Population (2025-12-31)
  - Total: 3,420
  - Density: 197/km^{2} (511/sq mi)
- Time zone: UTC+01:00 (CET)
  - Summer (DST): UTC+02:00 (CEST)
- Postal codes: 85664
- Dialling codes: 08124
- Vehicle registration: EBE
- Website: www.hohenlinden.de

Hohenlinden (meaning "high linden trees"; (Note: German hohe meaning "high", Linden meaning "linden trees" (singular: Linde)) colloquially: Linden; in the Bavarian dialect: Hea-lin) is a community in the Upper Bavarian district of Ebersberg. The city of Lynden, Washington is named after it, as is Linden, Alabama. Hohenlinden is also the subject of an eponymous poem by Thomas Campbell.

== Geography ==
Hohenlinden lies in the Munich Planning Region roughly 35 km east of Munich.

Hohenlinden has the following traditional rural land units (Gemarkungen in German): Ebersberger Forst and Hohenlinden.

== History ==
Hohenlinden belonged to the Electorate of Bavaria and was part of the lordly estate of Hofmark Ebersberg of the Order of Malta, which was disbanded in 1808.

It was here that the Battle of Hohenlinden was fought on 3 December 1800.

=== Religion ===
The community is home to two churches, the Kirche Mariä Heimsuchung (Church of the Visitation) built in 1489 in Late Gothic style, and the Pfarrkirche St. Josef (St. Joseph's Parish Church), built in 1903 in neo-Gothic style.

=== Population development ===
Year	Inhabitants
1970	1,854
1987	2,149
2000	2,616
2005	2,758
2006	2,964

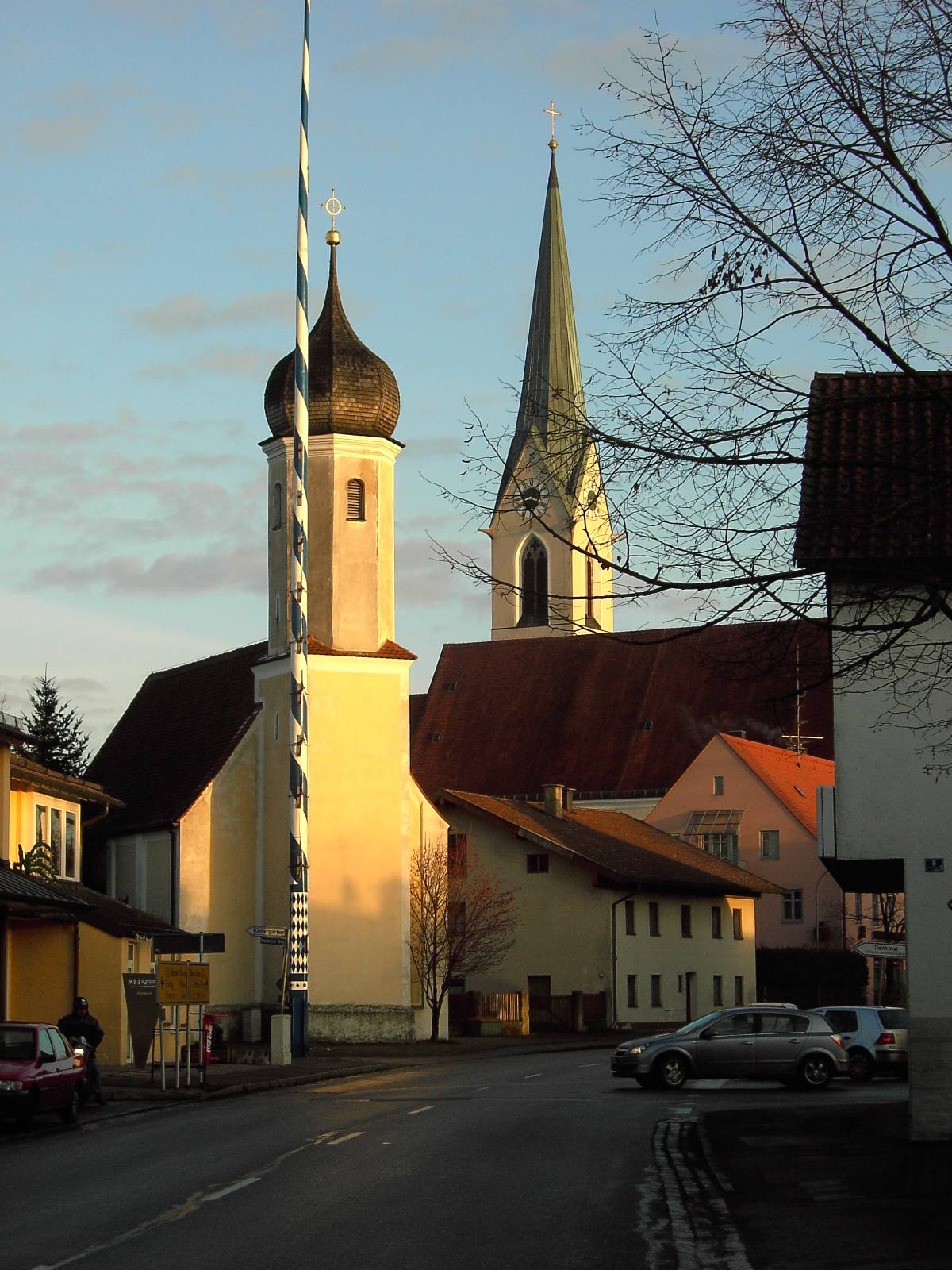
View of the main street, in the foreground the old church, in the background the new

== Politics ==
Hohenlinden's mayor (Bürgermeister) is Ludwig Maurer, an independent who was elected in 1998.

In 1999, the community's tax revenue, converted to euros, was €1,552,000 of which €160,000 was business taxes.

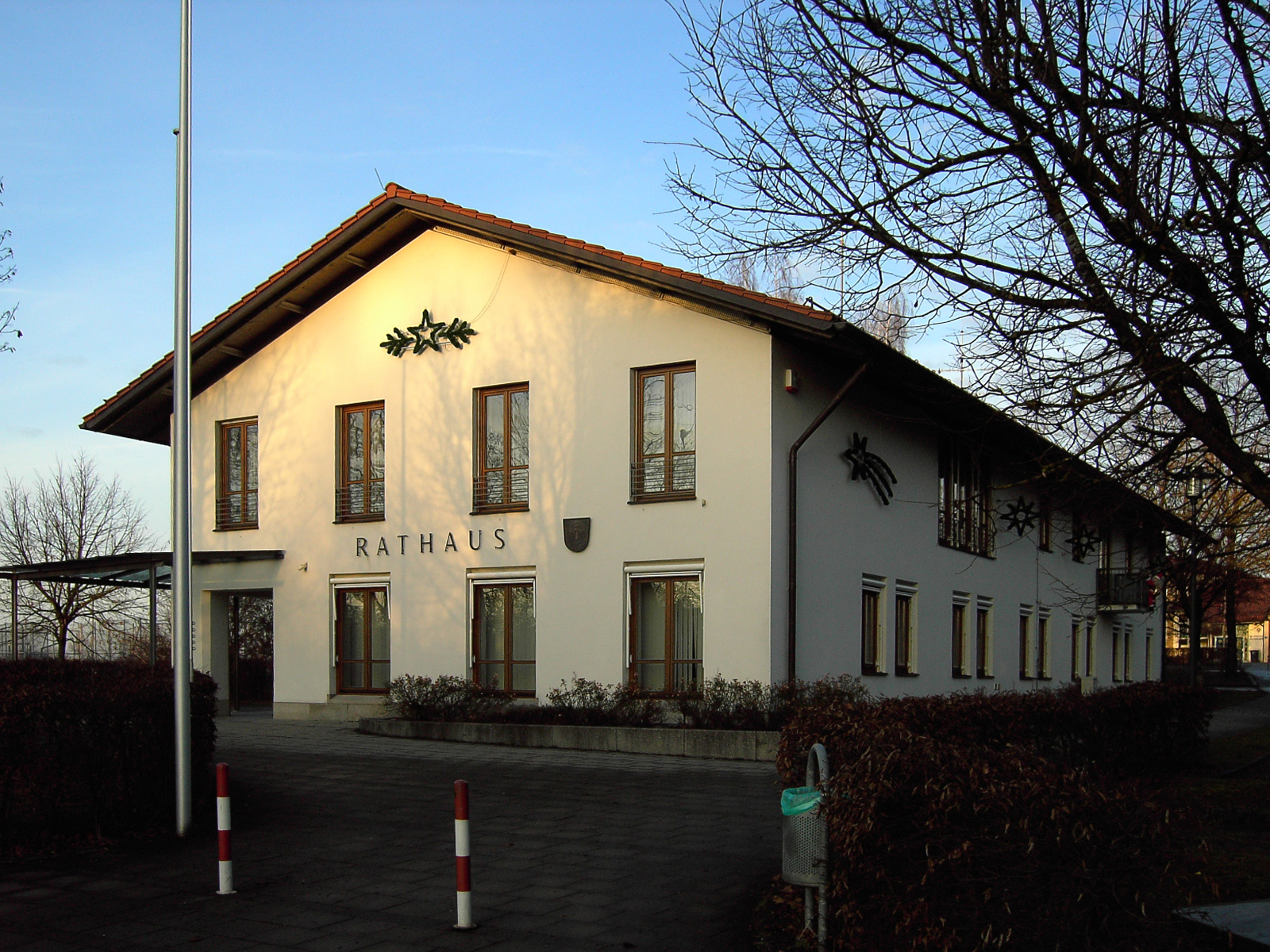
Hohenlinden's Town Hall

== Economy and infrastructure ==
According to official statistics, 155 people on the social insurance contribution rolls were employed in industry in 1998 in Hohenlinden and in trade and transport none. In other fields, 1,470 people on the aforesaid rolls were employed, and 1,103 worked from their homes. There were no employees in processing industries. There were 5 businesses in contracting. Furthermore, in 1999, there were 43 agricultural businesses with a productive area of 772 ha.

Over the past few decades, Hohenlinden's location near the Bundesstraße 12 (B12), one of Bavaria's most important traffic routes, has brought about a boom in the number of shops. There are four inns, three traditional Bavarian ones (Gasthof zur Post, Gasthof Steutzger and Hotel zur Linde) and one Italian (La Posta).

Besides several smaller shops, there is a REWE and an EDEKA supermarket, two car dealerships (Porsche and Mercedes-Benz), a driving school (City Fahrschule II), a pharmacy, and two filling stations.

=== Tourism ===
The small tourism centre has at its disposal various leisure facilities from hiking and golf on the nearby Thailing lands or the GC Ebersberg (golf club) to the “forest lore walk”, the so-called Hohenlindener Sauschütt in the nearby Ebersberg Forest, which offers hiking and cycling.

Hohenlinden

On Linden, when the sun was low, All bloodless lay the untrodden snow, And dark as winter was the flow Of Iser, rolling rapidly.

— Thomas Campbell, Verse 1, Hohenlinden Poem

== Culture ==
The Bavarian dialect is very common and widespread in Hohenlinden. In Bavarian, Hohenlinden is called Healin.

== Associations ==
Hohenlinden offers a wide choice of associations and clubs. Most of them are free for everyone to join and only charge a small annual fee to cover their expenses. The most popular associations are the Sportvereinigung Hohenlinden, the Trachtenverein Hohenlinden, the Boeller-Verein, the Hohenlinden volunteer fire brigade, the shooting club, Hohenlinden theatre club and the Hohenlindener Burschenverein (since 2009).

Other popular organisations are the Landfrauen, the Motocrossverein, the Tischtennisverein (table tennis), the Eisstockschützen, Pfadfinder Impeesa (scouts) and the Verein Hohenlinden 2000 e.V.

== Education ==
In 2012 the following institutions could be found in Hohenlinden:

- 2 Kindergartens with 100 children
- 1 Elementary schools with 16 teachers and 222 pupils

== Famous people ==
The former German goalkeeper Sepp Maier lives in Hohenlinden.

== Poems ==
A commonly associated poem with the city is "Hohenlinden" by Thomas Campbell.
