= Battle of Mühldorf =

1322 battle between the duchies of Austria and Bavaria

Coordinates: 48.2764°N 12.5597°E

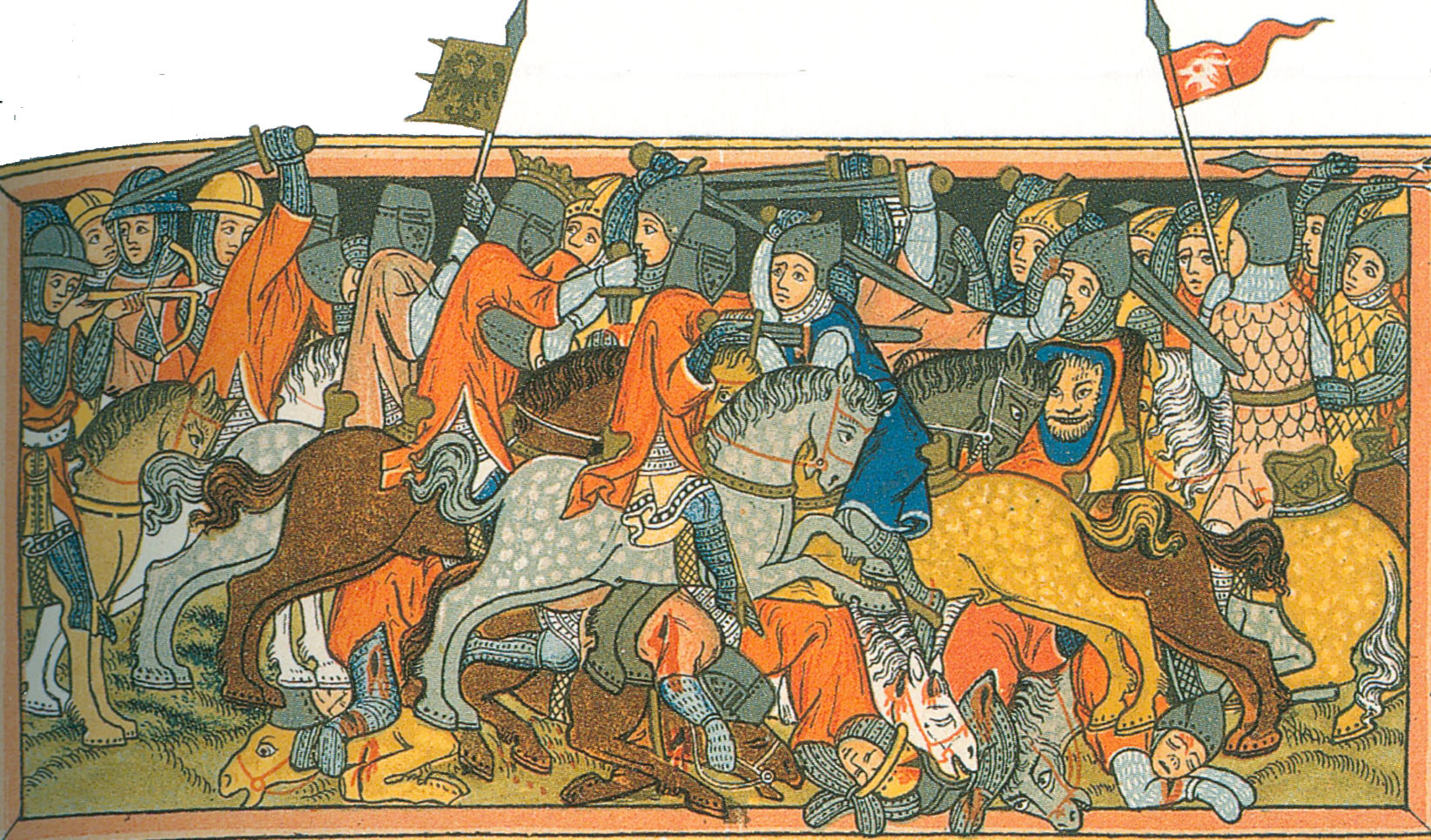
- Contemporary depiction, about 1334
| Date | September 28, 1322 |
| Location | Ampfing Heath (?), Mühldorf |
| Result | Bavarian victory: Capture of Frederick of Habsburg |

Belligerents
| Duchy of (Upper) Bavaria; Kingdom of Bohemia; Burgraviate of Nuremberg | Duchy of Austria; Duchy of Carinthia; Prince-Archbishopric of Salzburg; Bishopric of Passau |

Commanders and leaders
| Louis of Wittelsbach; John of Bohemia; Frederick IV of Nuremberg | Frederick of Habsburg; Henry of Carinthia |

Strength
| 1,800 knights, 4,000 footmen | 1,400 knights, 5,000 Hungarians and Cumans, additional footmen |

Casualties and losses
| Unknown | More than 1,000 nobles including Frederick captured |

The Battle of Mühldorf (also known as the Battle of Ampfing) was fought near Mühldorf am Inn on September 28, 1322 between the Duchy of (Upper) Bavaria and the Archduchy of Austria. The Bavarians were led by German King Louis of Wittelsbach, while the Austrians were under the command of his cousin, Anti-king Frederick of Habsburg.

== Background ==
The early 14th century had the powerful dynasties of Habsburg, Luxembourg, and Wittelsbach rivaling for the rule over the Holy Roman Empire, and the prince-electors were anxious not to allow a noble family to install a hereditary monarchy. After the death of Emperor Henry VII of Luxembourg in 1313, the electoral college denied the succession of his son John of Bohemia and instead accorded its favour to Louis of Wittelsbach and Frederick of Habsburg, but it was split over the question of whom to choose.

Therefore, in 1314, a double election took place at Frankfurt. Cologne, the Electorate of the Palatinate, Bohemia, and the Duchy of Saxe-Wittenberg voted for Frederick as Rex Romanorum. Mainz, Archbishopric of Trier, Brandenburg and Elector John II of Saxe-Lauenburg (whose electoral dignity was denied by their Saxe-Wittenberg cousins) adopted Louis.

The draw resulted in a protracted conflict with violent fights in which both sides tried to gain the support of the Imperial estates. In addition, Louis had to settle the domestic dispute with his brother Count Palatine Rudolf I, who had voted against him, which finally ended with Rudolf's death in 1319. Meanwhile, Frederick continued his campaigns into Bavaria, devastating Louis' duchy several times without meeting much resistance.

== Battle ==
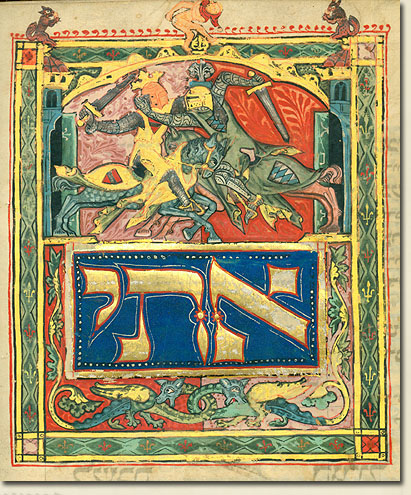
Frederick and Louis in combat, from the Tripartite Mahzor

In 1322, Frederick, encouraged by his previous expeditions, allied with the Bishop of Passau and the Salzburg Archbishopric. Their armed forces met on September 24 near Mühldorf on the Inn River, where Frederick expected the arrival of further troops from Further Austria, led by his brother Leopold.

The battle did not go well for the Austrians. Louis had forged an alliance with John of Bohemia and Burggrave Frederick IV of Nuremberg and on September 28 reached Mühldorf with a sizable army, including 1,800 knights and 500-600 mounted Hungarian archers. Meanwhile, Leopold's relief troops were barred from reaching the battlefield in time. Despite the unfavorable situation, Frederick agreed to meet Louis's knights at once. Frederick's army was defeated by Louis' outnumbering forces with high losses on both sides. More than 1,000 noblemen from Austria and Salzburg were captured, as were Frederick himself and his younger brother, Henry the Friendly.

== Aftermath ==
Though Louis had prevailed, his royal title remained contested, especially by Pope John XXII and Frederick's brother Leopold, who remained a fierce opponent. After three years Louis had to release Frederick from captivity and reconcile with him and even offered him a joint rule and the Rex Romanorum title in return for his support to receive the Imperial crown. Neither the House of Wittelsbach nor the Habsburgs were able to defend their claims to the royal title, which after Louis' death in 1347 again passed to Charles IV of the House of Luxembourg.

== See also ==
- Battle of Gammelsdorf

== Sources ==
- Delbrück, Hans, trans. Walter Renfroe Jr. History of the Art of War, Volume III: Medieval Warfare (Lincoln: University of Nebraska Press, 1982)
