= Louis Bastoul =

French general (1753–1801)

- Born: 19 August 1753; Montolieu, Languedoc, Kingdom of France
- Died: 15 January 1801 (aged 45); Munich, Bavaria
- Military career
- Allegiance: France
- Conflicts: French Revolutionary Wars

Louis Bastoul was a French general in the French Revolutionary Wars. He was born in Montolieu 19 August 1753, and died in Munich on 15 January 1801, of wounds received at the Battle of Hohenlinden.

== Service ==
- Volunteer in the regiment Vivarais Infantry September 30, 1789.
- Sergent, furloughed this date.
- Captain, commander of the National Guard of Béthune (Pas-de-Calais) in 1790.
- Promoted to Chef de battalion of the 2nd Battalion of the national volunteers the department of Pas-de-Calais in 1791.
- Promoted to Brigadier General on 15 September 1793 .

== Campaigns and actions ==
- 1793 assigned to the Army of the North
- 1794 to the Army of Sambre-et-Meuse, under the command of General Jourdan. In this capacity, he contributed to the recovery of Landrecy and Quesnoy from the Prussians.
- 1796 deployed to the Army of the Rhine.

- 19 June 1796 : At Battle of Wetzlar-Uckerath in Westphalia, under the command of General Jean Baptiste Kléber, he routed the left wing of the Austrian army commanded by General Pal Kray and took the village of Kirchpruh.
- 10 July 1796: Battle of Friedberg, he contributed to winning the battle by driving with few troops, the enemy was entrenched in a wood.
- 24 August 1796 : Battle of Amberg, he was cited with praise for the courage he had displayed on the ground. He was wounded and had his horse killed under him.
- 3 September 1796 : Battle of Würzburg

- 18 April 1797 : At the Battle of Neuwied, he played an important part in the success of the crossing of the Rhine during the withdrawal of the army commanded by Hoche. On this occasion, General Grenier, responsible for an attack on Hettersdorf, placed nine companies of grenadiers, plus the Demi brigades to which they belonged, under the command of Bastoul. General Bastoul, at the head of these troops, took enemy entrenchments in a bayonet charge.

== Danube Campaign 1800-1801 ==
- May 3, 1800 : At the Battle of Engen (Baden-Wuerttemberg), its division engaged the enemy with a fierce battle. Having penetrated a part of his troops in the woods overlooking a plateau; he turned and flanked 8 Austrian battalions on the ground and put them in complete rout.
- 4 and 5 May 1800 : At the Battle of Messkirch, he marched swiftly to support the division of General Delmas, who was overwhelmed, and successfully repulsed all attacks against the Austrian extreme left of the French army.
- 7 July 1800 : the battle of Landshut, General Leclerc was ordered to seize the city of Landshut (Bavaria). Placed left wing attack and strong two squadrons of cavalry, a battalion of the 53rd demi-brigade, three companies of grenadiers, the troops of General Bastoul prevailed in their office two doors and a bridge and rejected the Austrians outside the city.
- 3 December 1800 : he participated as commander of an infantry division in the Battle of Hohenlinden, under the command of Moreau. One of its brigades being in high difficulty, he formed his company in attack column and marched on the Austrian line, aided by the infantry brigade of General Bonet and the cavalry of General Fauconnet. He succeeded, by this action, to rout the Austrians who left several guns and prisoners.

In this, he was seriously wounded, hit by a bullet which crushed his leg. On 3 December 1800, moved to Munich, he refused to allow the amputation of his leg, "the whole live or die." He died there a month later.
