= Battle of Amsteg =

- Part of the War of the Second Coalition
- Amsteg and the Reuss River (1932)
Date	14–16 August 1799
Location	Silenen, Uri, Switzerland 46°47′N 8°40′E
Result	French victory

Belligerents
France	(Holy Roman Empire) Habsburg monarchy

Commanders and leaders
(France) Claude Lecourbe	(Holy Roman Empire) Joseph Simbschen

Strength
(France) 8,000–12,000	(Holy Roman Empire) 4,400

Casualties and losses
Battle: 500; Campaign: 1,500	Battle: 2,300, 3–12 guns Campaign: 7,500, 12 guns

War of the Second Coalition:
Austria
The color black indicates the current battle.

The Battle of Amsteg (14–16 August 1799) saw a Republican French division under General of Division Claude Lecourbe face a brigade of Habsburg Austrian soldiers led by General-major Joseph Anton von Simbschen. Lecourbe's offensive began on 14 August when six columns of French infantry advanced on the upper Reuss valley from the north and east. By 16 August, Lecourbe's forces had driven Simbschen's Austrians from the valley and seized control of the strategic Gotthard Pass between Italy and Switzerland.

On 4 June, the First Battle of Zurich was fought between André Masséna's French Army of Helvetia and an Austrian army led by Archduke Charles, Duke of Teschen. After the battle, Massena relinquished Zürich and retreated to a strong defensive position to the west of the city. At about the same time, the French commander ordered Lecourbe to abandon the Gotthard Pass and pull back to Lucerne. In August, Masséna had second thoughts and wanted Lecourbe to recapture the Gotthard Pass. The French commander feared an Austro-Russian stroke from Italy across the pass, so he ordered an offensive to occupy the area. Louis Marie Turreau's division advanced northeast from the Canton of Valais in support of Lecourbe. Masséna sent the divisions of Jean-de-Dieu Soult and Joseph Chabran to attack other Austrian positions in order to prevent Archduke Charles from interfering with Lecourbe's main operation. At the end of September 1799, Alexander Suvorov's Russian army had to retake the pass in the Battle of Gotthard Pass.

== Background ==
=== Operations ===
Lecourbe's Engadine campaign began with a victory on 12 March 1799 at La Punt Chamues-ch. By 2 May Lecourbe was back at La Punt and on 13 May he arrived at Bellinzona, having completely abandoned the Engadine. At the end of April, a rebellion broke out among the Swiss in the Cantons of Uri, Schwyz, and Unterwalden. Since this insurrection cut his communications with Lecourbe and his right wing, Massena sent Soult to suppress it. Promising clemency, Soult managed to get the rebels in Schwyz to disperse. He acted more vigorously to drive the insurgents out of the upper Reuss valley, by storming their trenches at Flüelen and again at Wassen on 11 May. Soult seized the Teufelsbrücke (Devil's Bridge) in Schöllenen Gorge before the rebels could break it down and overran the insurgent position at the Gotthard Pass. On 15 May, his troops met soldiers of Michel Ney's brigade of Lecourbe's division at Faido on the upper Ticino River.

Consolidating his position, Masséna ordered Lecourbe to pull back. On 21 May 1799 he began withdrawing from Bellinzona across the Gotthard Pass. By 24 May, Lecourbe was at Altdorf on the upper Reuss. Promoted to general of division, Ney soon transferred out of Lecourbe's division. On the Allied side, Heinrich von Bellegarde's Austrian corps marched from the upper Rhine valley south via Lake Como to Alessandria which it reached on 8 June. To replace these troops, the Allied commander-in-chief in Italy, Suvorov ordered Karl Joseph Hadik von Futak and 16 battalions to the north and the leading formations began moving across the Gotthard Pass on 27 May. Two days later, Franz Xaver Saint-Julien with 6,300 Austrian soldiers defeated Louis Henri Loison and 3,300 French troops in the Urseren valley. The Austrians inflicted 664 casualties on their foes while losing only 200. On 31 May, Lecourbe with 8,000 troops turned the tables on Saint-Julien at Wassen. On 2 June, Lecourbe drove Saint-Julien back across the Devil's Bridge, which the Austrians broke down. Two battalions of Austrians were cut off and forced to surrender. According to orders, Lecourbe now evacuated the upper Reuss valley and withdrew to Lucerne.

On 4 June, Archduke Charles commanding 53,000 Austrians attacked Masséna who led 45,000 French in the First Battle of Zurich. The victorious Austrians suffered heavier losses, 730 killed, 1,470 wounded, and 2,200 captured, while the French lost 500 killed, 800 wounded, and 300 captured. Another authority stated that the Austrians lost 2,000 killed and wounded plus 1,200 captured while the French sustained over 1,200 casualties. On 4 June, the Austrians broke into the French position but were driven out by a ferocious counterattack. However, Masséna conceded defeat by withdrawing from Zürich to a stronger position west of the city on the night of 5 June.

=== Strategy ===
At this time Masséna's Army of Helvetia was arranged as follows. Lecourbe's 1st Division (11,279 men) was on the right flank at Lucerne and Chabran's 2nd Division held the line between Lucerne and the Albis Hills west of Zürich. Soult's 3rd Division (6,986) held the Albis Hills with Jean Thomas Guillaume Lorge's 4th Division (9,040) to its left. Jean Victor Tharreau's 5th Division (9,046) held the line of the Limmat River from Baden to Böttstein. François Goullus' 6th Division (5,753) guarded the line of the Aare River down to the Rhine River and Joseph Souham's 7th Division (10,059) defended the Rhine down to Basel. The 6th and 7th Divisions were directed by Pierre Marie Barthélemy Ferino. The Reserve under Jean Joseph Amable Humbert (4,527) was at Mellingen southwest of Baden and the Cavalry Reserve under Louis Klein was at Geneva and other places in the rear. The Interior Division under Louis-Antoine Choin de Montchoisy (3,170) occupied Bern and the Valais Division under Turreau (7,561) held the Great St Bernard Pass and the Canton of Valais. Masséna's force counted 76,781 troops, but only 59,000 were available for field service. Technically under Massena were the divisions of Claude Juste Alexandre Legrand (6,186) and Claude-Sylvestre Colaud (5,106) guarding the Rhine north of Basel. Earlier, Masséna suggested that Legrand and Colaud be formed into a separate Army of the Rhine but this was not acted on until 2 July 1799.

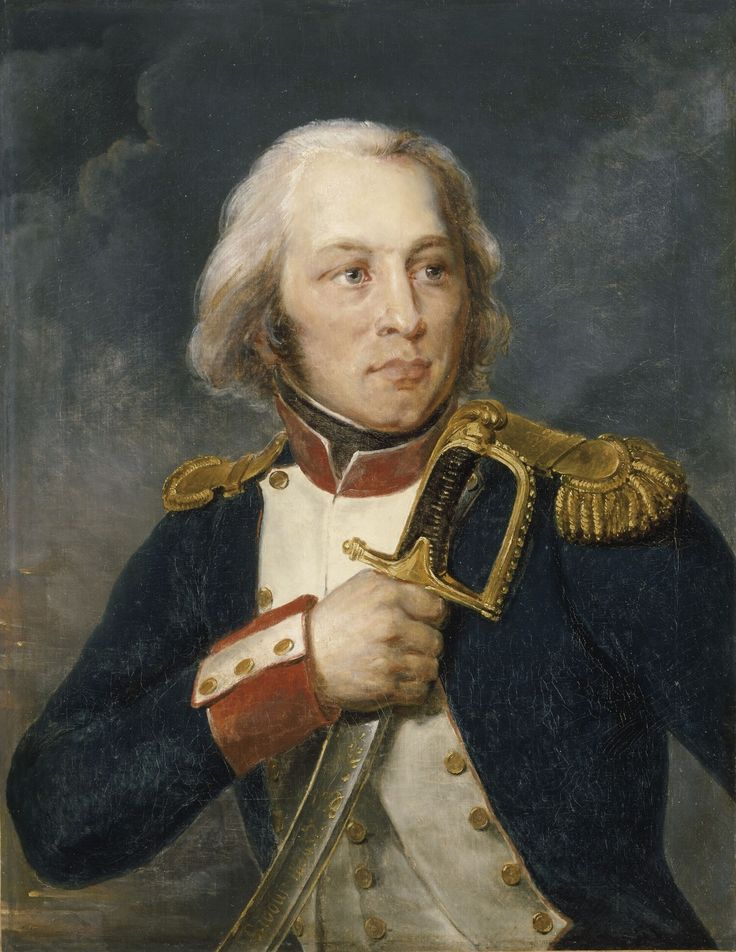
Claude Lecourbe

According to various estimates, Archduke Charles led between 61,000 and 85,000 Austrians. One estimate gave him 54,000 infantry and 18,000 cavalry. Perhaps 20,000 were north and east of the Rhine watching Legrand, Colaud, and Ferino. Gottfried von Strauch's brigade occupied the Gotthard Pass, the Furka Pass to its west, and the Grimsel Pass farther west which leads north into the Aare valley. Karl von Bey's brigade held the upper Reuss valley. Charles established a flotilla on Lake Zurich under the command of James Ernest Williams. Charles told British agent William Wickham that his army could probably drive the French from their positions before Zürich, but it would cost his troops so many casualties that he would be unable to exploit the victory. Charles planned to wait for Alexander Korsakov and his approaching Russian army to join him. During the stalemate, the Austrians grew careless of security, even to the extent of inviting French musicians to play at their dances in Zürich.

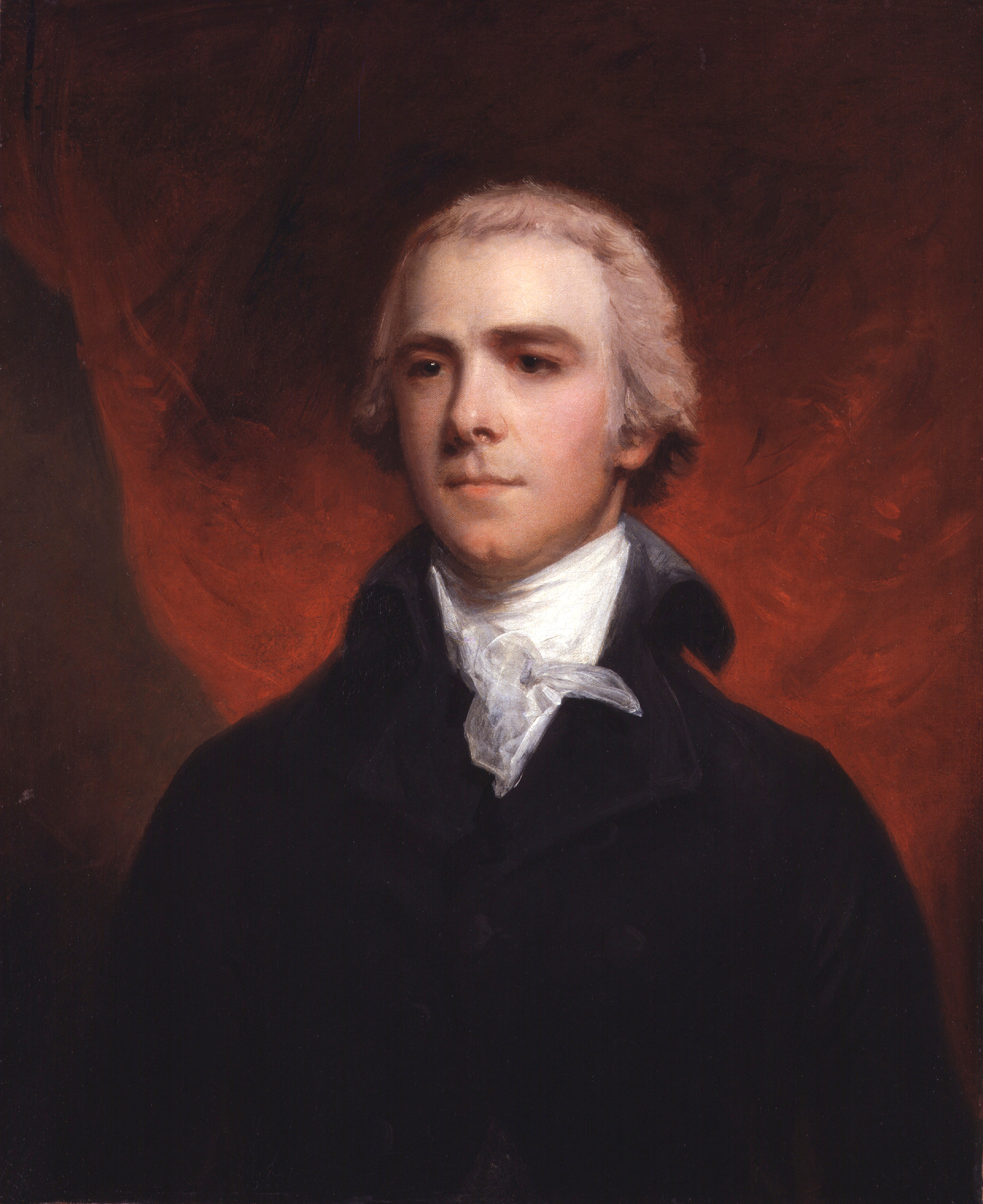
Lord William Grenville

Unknown to the French and even to the Austrian and Russian army commanders, Allied strategists were on the verge of making a colossal strategic blunder. In 1799, William Grenville, 1st Baron Grenville was British Secretary of State for Foreign and Commonwealth Affairs under Prime Minister William Pitt the Younger. Grenville concocted a scheme whereby Korsakov with 45,000 Russians would be joined by Suvorov with 20,000 Russians from Italy. Suvorov would take command of the combined army and drive the French from Switzerland. In the second phase, Suvorov would thrust into Franche-Comté, an area of France weakly defended by frontier fortresses. Meanwhile, Archduke Charles would move north into Germany, leaving 18,000 Austrians under Friedrich Freiherr von Hotze to cooperate with the Russians. Charles and 60,000 troops would strike across the lower Rhine from Germany into France. Far to the north, a joint Anglo-Russian army would invade the Batavian Republic, a satellite of France. The plan was sent on 8 June to Emperor Paul I of Russia, who approved it. Emperor Francis and his foreign minister Johann Amadeus von Thugut endorsed the plan because it came to them via Emperor Paul and it was a good excuse to get Suvorov out of Italy.

On 7 August, when the plan was revealed to Archduke Charles, that general voiced his misgivings about the Russians, "I don't know how they will manage, especially if we take ourselves off any distance". Korsakov was startled when the plan was divulged to him on 12 August. The Russian stated that his army's strength was 28,000 effectives rather than the 45,000 counted on by the armchair strategists. Wickham, who hoped to raise 20,000 pro-Allied Swiss troops, was disappointed that only 2,000 could be recruited. The Army of Condé, made up of 6,000 French Royalists, was marching from Russia and would not arrive in southern Germany until 1 October.

== Battle ==
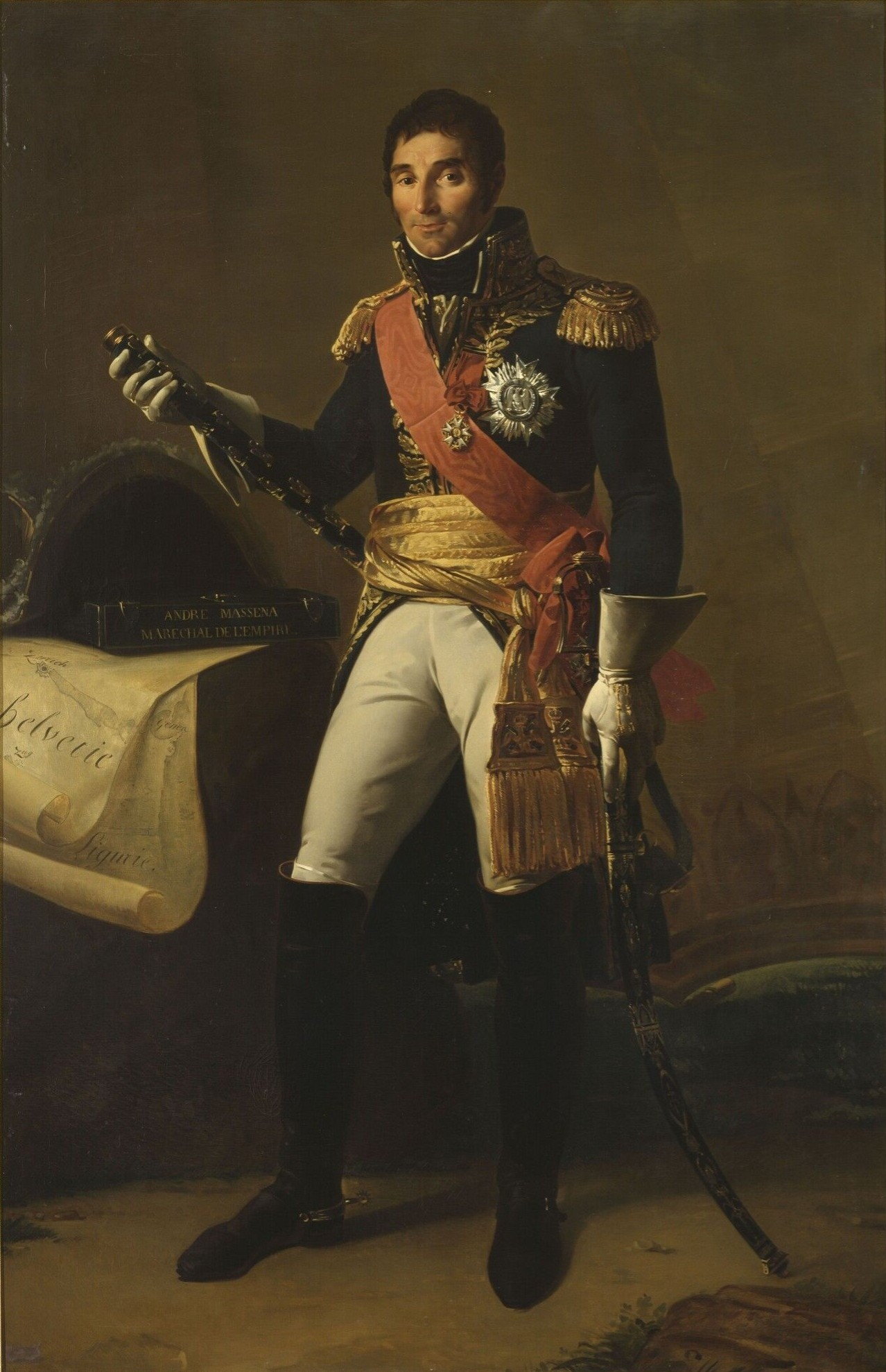
Andre Masséna

Masséna decided that recapturing the Gotthard Pass would protect his strategic rear and open communications with the French Army of Italy. He probably had no inkling that Suvorov would soon cross the Gotthard Pass, but he knew it was possible that Bellegarde's corps might try it. A thrust north over the pass, then west across the Furka Pass and then north again across the Grimsel Pass would place an Allied force in the upper Aare valley and in a position to hit Masséna's rear. To guard against this eventuality, Masséna ordered Lecourbe to seize this critical terrain. Lecourbe had 10,000 troops and his campaign lasted from 14–16 August 1799.

Lecourbe's division was organized in three brigades under Charles-Étienne Gudin, Jacques Denis Boivin, and Loison. Boivin's brigade consisted of the 1st and 3rd Battalions of the 84th Line Infantry Demi-brigade and three battalions of the 109th Line Demi-brigade. Loison's brigade included two battalions each of the 36th and 38th Line and three battalions of the 76th Line. This source credited Lecourbe with 12,000 troops. Simbschen's brigade counted 4,400 soldiers and was made up of two battalions of the Kerpen Infantry Regiment Nr. 49, the 2nd Battalion of Infantry Regiment Nr. 62, two squadrons of the Modena Dragoon Regiment Nr. 5, and one battalion each of the Neugebauer Infantry Regiment Nr. 46, Gradiskaner Grenz Infantry Regiment Nr. 8, and Deutsch-Banater Grenz Nr. 12.

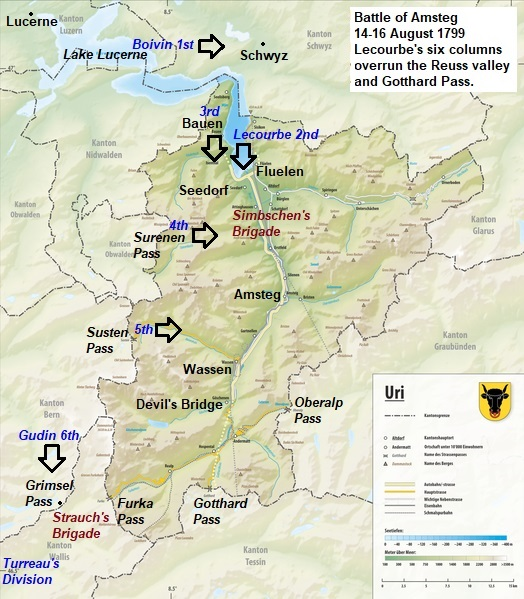
Battle of Amsteg, 14-16 Aug. 1799

Lecourbe divided his division into six columns. The first column was his left brigade under Boivin which struck southeast through Steinen and Seewen toward Schwyz and Muotathal. In the Battle of Schwyz on 14 August, the French drove the Austrians from the town. The French lost 28 killed and 140 wounded. They claimed that the Austrians lost 195 killed and 610 wounded, plus 1,000 soldiers and five guns captured. The author found the losses exaggerated. The French sacked the town after the battle. Lecourbe personally accompanied the second column which boated across Lake Lucerne and landed at Flüelen at the head of the upper Reuss valley. Eight grenadier companies conducted this amphibious operation. As Lecourbe advanced south, the flanking columns joined him one by one as they came through the mountain passes from the west.

The third column marched along the western shore of Lake Lucerne through Bauen and the Isenthal, meeting Lecourbe at Seedorf. The fourth column hiked across the Surenen Pass to reach Erstfeld in the Reuss valley. The fifth column marched from Gadmen across the Susten Pass to Wassen. In the face of this advance, Simbschen withdrew south to the Devil's Bridge where he broke the arch and held his ground. Farther to the west, Gudin's right brigade formed the sixth column which moved south up the Aare valley. According to historian Digby Smith, Gudin's 2,400-strong brigade consisted of the 25th Light Infantry Demi-brigade and a Swiss battalion. Though the Austrian position at Grimsel Pass was very strong, the French surprised their adversaries by taking them in flank. Strauch's 2,600 troops were hustled out of their defenses with heavy losses, especially in the Neugebauer Infantry Regiment Nr. 46. Other Austrian units that were engaged were the Deutsch-Banater Nr. 12 and Warasdiner-St. George Nr. 6 Grenz Infantry Regiments, Wallis Infantry Regiment Nr. 11, Siegenfeld Light Infantry Battalion Nr. 10, Carneville Freikorps, and one squadron of the Erdody Hussar Regiment Nr. 9. The French claimed to have killed and wounded 400 men and captured 500 more, while admitting 60 casualties. An Allied source estimated losses at 200 killed and wounded plus 500 captured.

Turreau's division advanced northeast up the Rhône valley, driving elements of Strauch's brigade before it. Turreau met Gudin's troops at the southern outlet of Grimsel Pass. Caught between the two French forces, Strauch's survivors retreated into Italy via the Nufenen Pass. Turreau then took control of the Grimsel Pass. Historian Ramsay Weston Phipps noted that Turreau is often confused with Tharreau in the histories. In fact, command of the Valais Division passed from Charles Antoine Xaintrailles to Tharreau and then to Turreau. In August 1799, Turreau cleared the Austrians from the Simplon Pass. He then defeated the Austrians in the Battle of Oberwald on 13–14 August, inflicting 3,000 casualties on his foes. In September, the Valais Division had two brigades under Jean-Baptiste Jacopin and Henri-Antoine Jardon and included the 28th, 83rd, 89th, and 101st Line Infantry Demi-brigades, the 1st, 4th, and 5th Swiss Battalions, and the 23rd Horse Chasseur Regiment.

With Strauch's brigade driven out of the area, Gudin's brigade turned east and climbed the Furka Pass. When Simbschen found Gudin's sixth column coming up in his rear, he abandoned the Devil's Bridge and retreated west to the lower slopes of the Crispalt. (This is near the Oberalp Pass.) Gudin and Lecourbe rendezvoused at 7:00 am on 16 August and combined to attack Simbschen. After a bitter fight, Simbschen was driven away to the east toward Disentis in the Vorderrhein valley. The Austrians reported losing 775 killed and wounded plus 526 prisoners and 12 guns. French casualties were about 600. Simbschen subsequently retreated farther east to Chur. The French took possession of the Gotthard Pass, Simplon Pass, and the upper Valais.

Lecourbe's offensive was aided by two diversionary attacks carried out by the divisions of Soult and Chabran. On the morning of 14 August, Soult's right brigade under Édouard Mortier crossed the Sihl River at Adliswil and attacked Wollishofen, a suburb of Zürich. Soult's left brigade under Jean-Baptiste Brunet assaulted Wiedikon, nearly seizing the town gate. Wickham, an eyewitness, claimed that if the French had pressed the attack home, they would have captured the town. Archduke Charles committed reinforcements and the French withdrew when the morning fog lifted. Other witnesses to the skirmish were the French traitors Jean-Charles Pichegru and Amédée Willot who were plotting a Royalist revolt. On 15 August, Chabran attacked the brigade of Franz Jellacic and drove it to the east bank of the Linth River. Charles heard the cannon fire from this encounter and worried whether Jellacic was being overwhelmed. He halted the march of six battalions to the northeast and ordered them back to Zürich. The final result was that Charles was too distracted to help Simbschen defend against Lecourbe.

== Aftermath ==
In the Battle of Amsteg, the French sustained 500 casualties while inflicting 2,300 killed, wounded, and missing on the Austrians and capturing three guns. Counting the related operations, total Austrian losses numbered 7,500 soldiers and 11 guns on 14–16 August. During this period, French casualties were about 1,500. The French fully exploited the Austrians' poor positioning of their troops, causing the disparity in losses. Historian Phipps called Lecourbe's campaign "splendid work". On 17 August, Archduke Charles tried to flank Masséna out of position by bridging the Aare at Döttingen. On this day, the opposing 5th Division was temporarily led by General of Brigade Étienne Heudelet de Bierre. Ney, now commanding the neighboring 6th Division, took charge of the defense and massed 12,000 French soldiers to oppose the crossing. The Austrian military engineers blundered and chose two unsuitable bridging locations. Swiss troops employed by the French sniped continually at the frustrated engineers. By 6:30 pm, the archduke gave up and withdrew his pontoon bridges.

Suvorov and his Austro-Russian army won the Battle of Novi on 15 August 1799. The Russian commander in chief wanted to finish off the defeated French army and clear it from Italy, but the Austrians counseled delay. In response to the loss of the Gotthard Pass, Suvorov sent Paul Kray and 10,000 troops marching north on 18 August. Finally, on 25 August Suvorov received a letter from Emperor Francis that his campaigning in Italy was over and that he was to take his army into Switzerland. Twice, the Russian general begged for a two-month delay, but the Austrian emperor insisted that Suvorov must march immediately. Thugut also demanded that Charles take his army out of Switzerland at once. Ultimately, the Allied strategy failed because of bad timing. Charles left Switzerland too early and Suvorov arrived in Switzerland too late. This left Korsakov and Hotze in a precarious position to face Masséna's French army. Masséna would take full advantage of this mistake in the Second Battle of Zurich on 25–26 September. Meanwhile, Suvorov would have to recapture Gotthard Pass on 24 September.
