= Second Battle of Zurich =

1799 battle of the War of the Second Coalition

- Part of the Italian and Swiss expedition of 1799
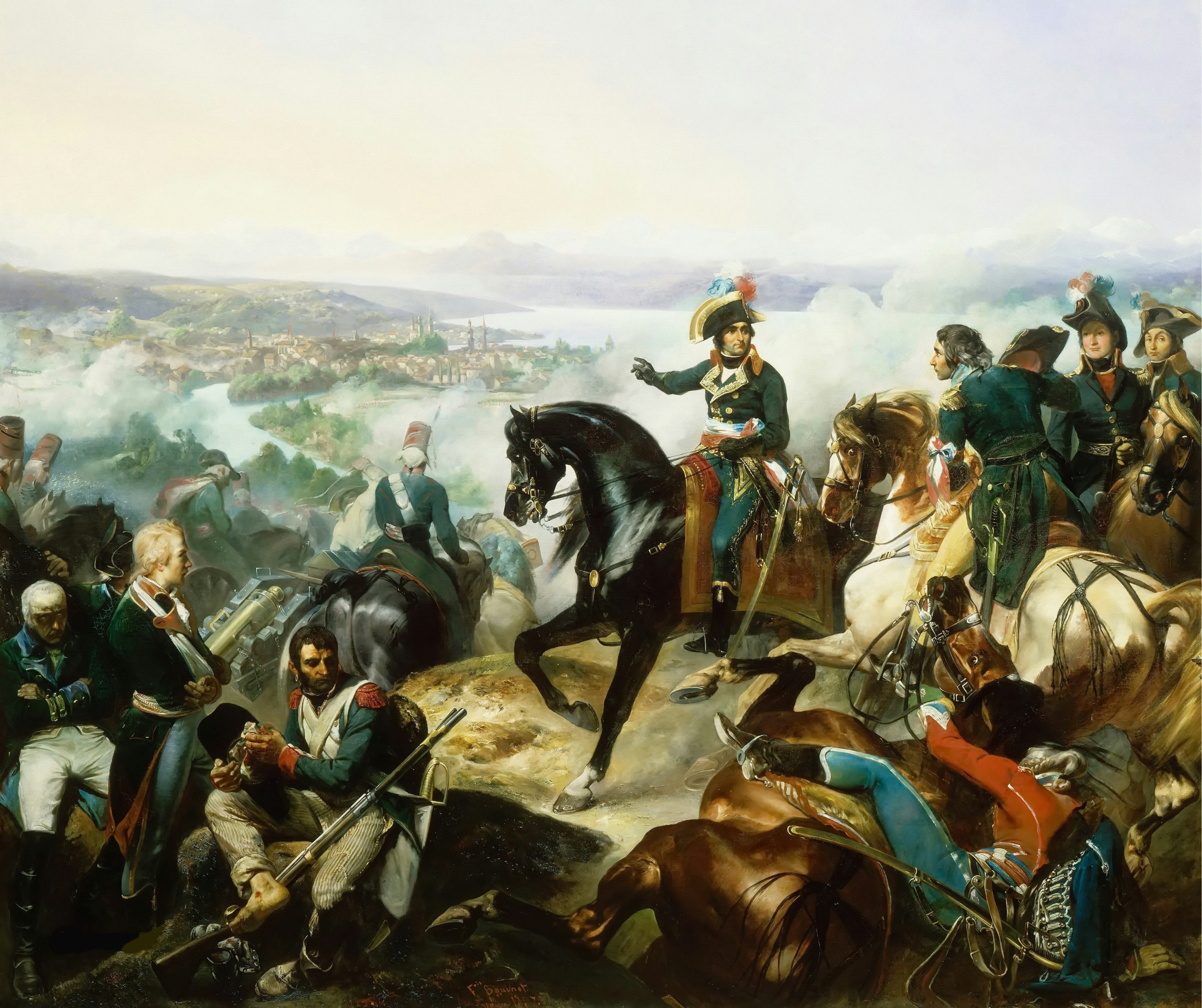
- The Battle of Zurich; François Bouchot, 1835
Date	25–26 September 1799
Location	Zürich, Helvetic Republic 47°22′N 8°33′E
Result	French victory

Belligerents
(French First Republic) French Republic	Russian Empire; Habsburg monarchy (Note: Battle of Linth River)

Commanders and leaders
(French First Republic) André Masséna (French First Republic) Édouard Mortier (French First Republic) Jean Ménard (French First Republic) Jean Lorge (French First Republic) Dominique Klein	(Russian Empire) Alexander Korsakov (Russian Empire) Mikhail Durasov (Russian Empire) Aleksey Gorchakov (Russian Empire) Fabian Osten-Sacken (Russian Empire) Nikolai Gudovich

Strength
(French First Republic) 35,448 (Note: Attended the battle, different estimates: 33,500; 35,448; Total force, different estimates: 76,000)	(Russian Empire) 27,116 (Note: Russia, different estimates: 19,600; 23,000; 27,116; 30,000)

Casualties and losses
4,000 killed or wounded (Note: 3,000; 4,000)	At least 8,000 casualties during the battle (Note: 8,000 killed, wounded, or captured; 8,000 killed or wounded and many captured; 8,000+ dead); 100 guns 4,000 more casualties during the retreat
- Location within Europe

War of the Second Coalition:
Austria
The color black indicates the current battle.

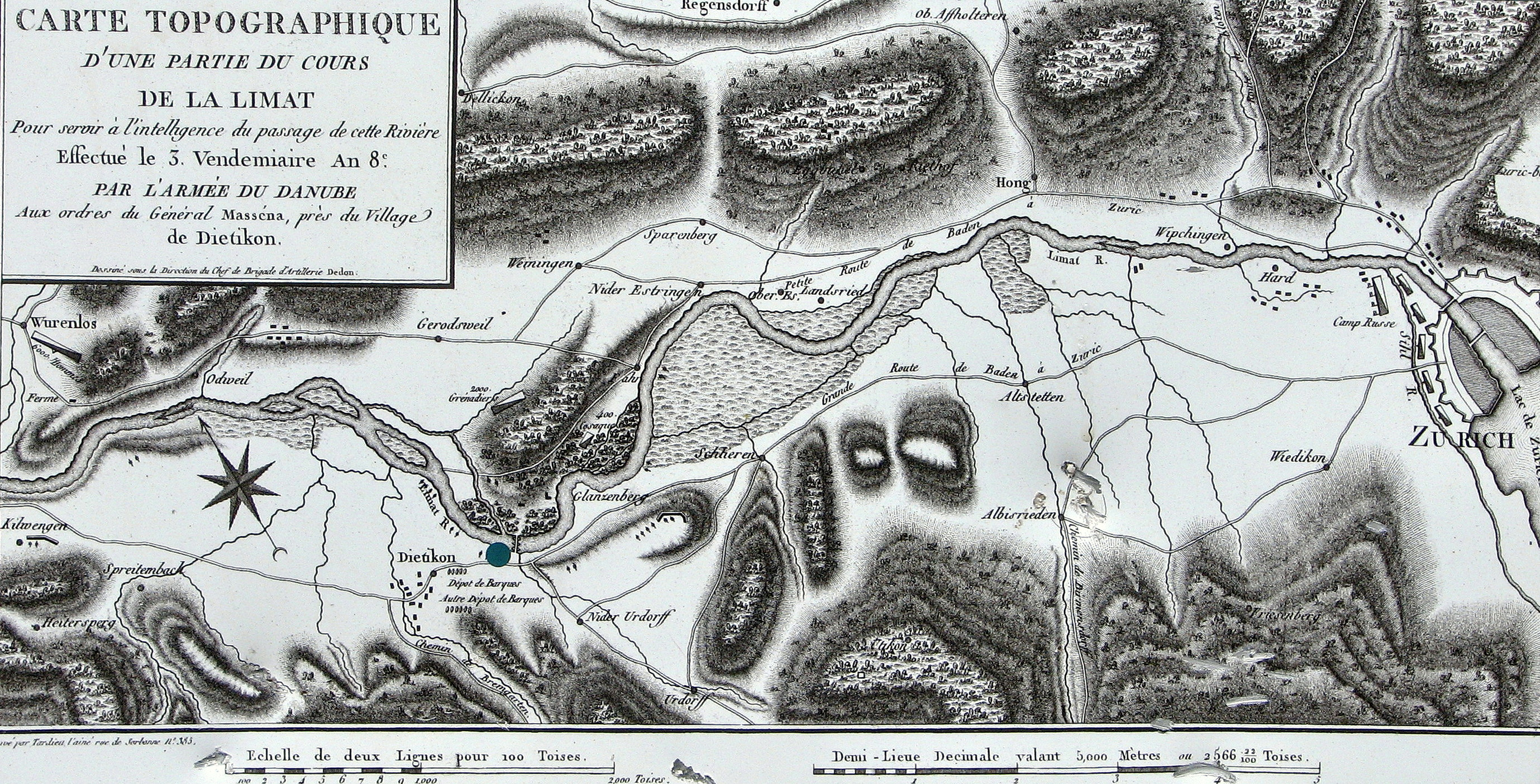
Map showing the French positions in the Limmat Valley (1801)

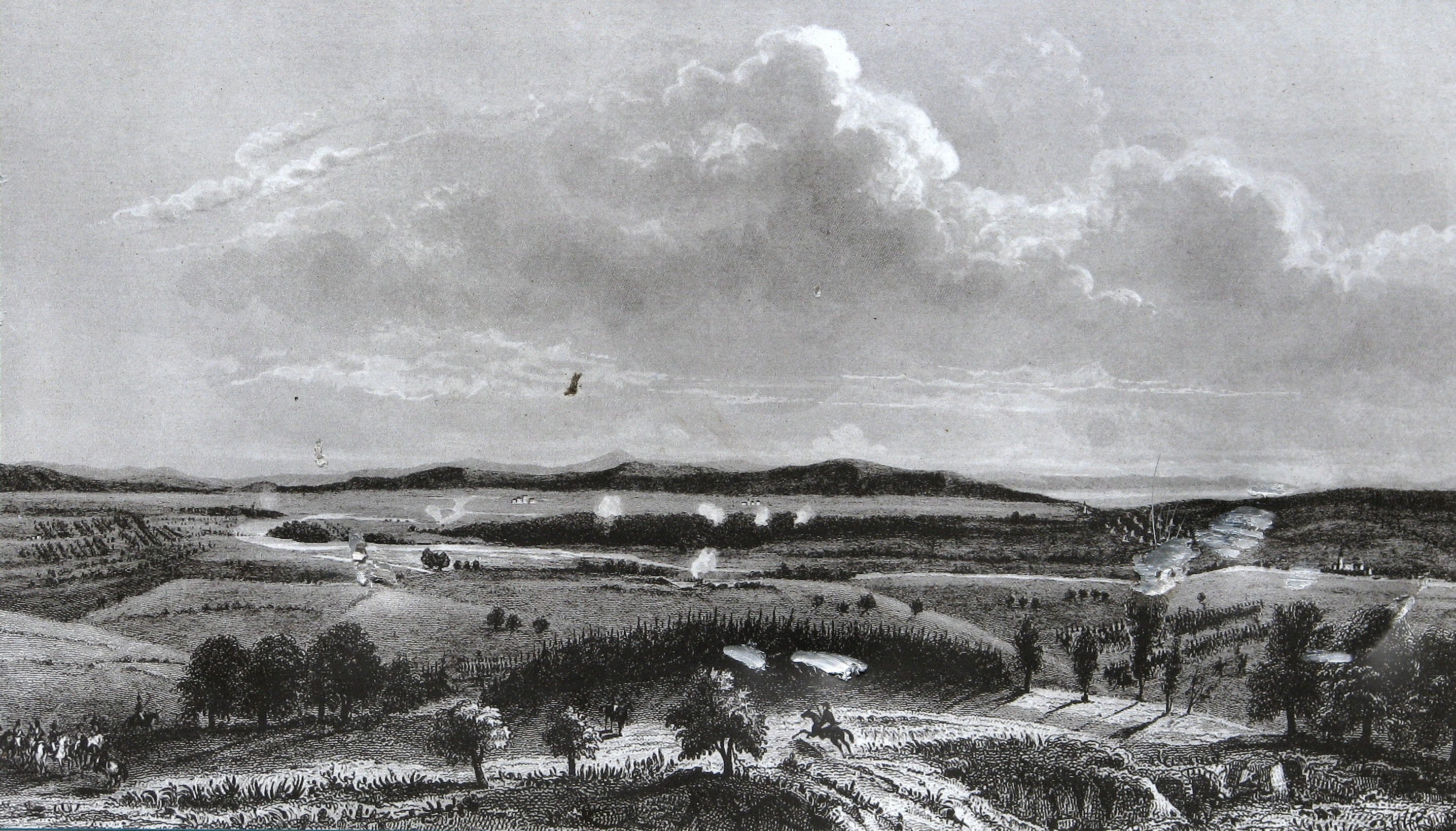
Contemporary drawing of the battle by Siméon Fort.

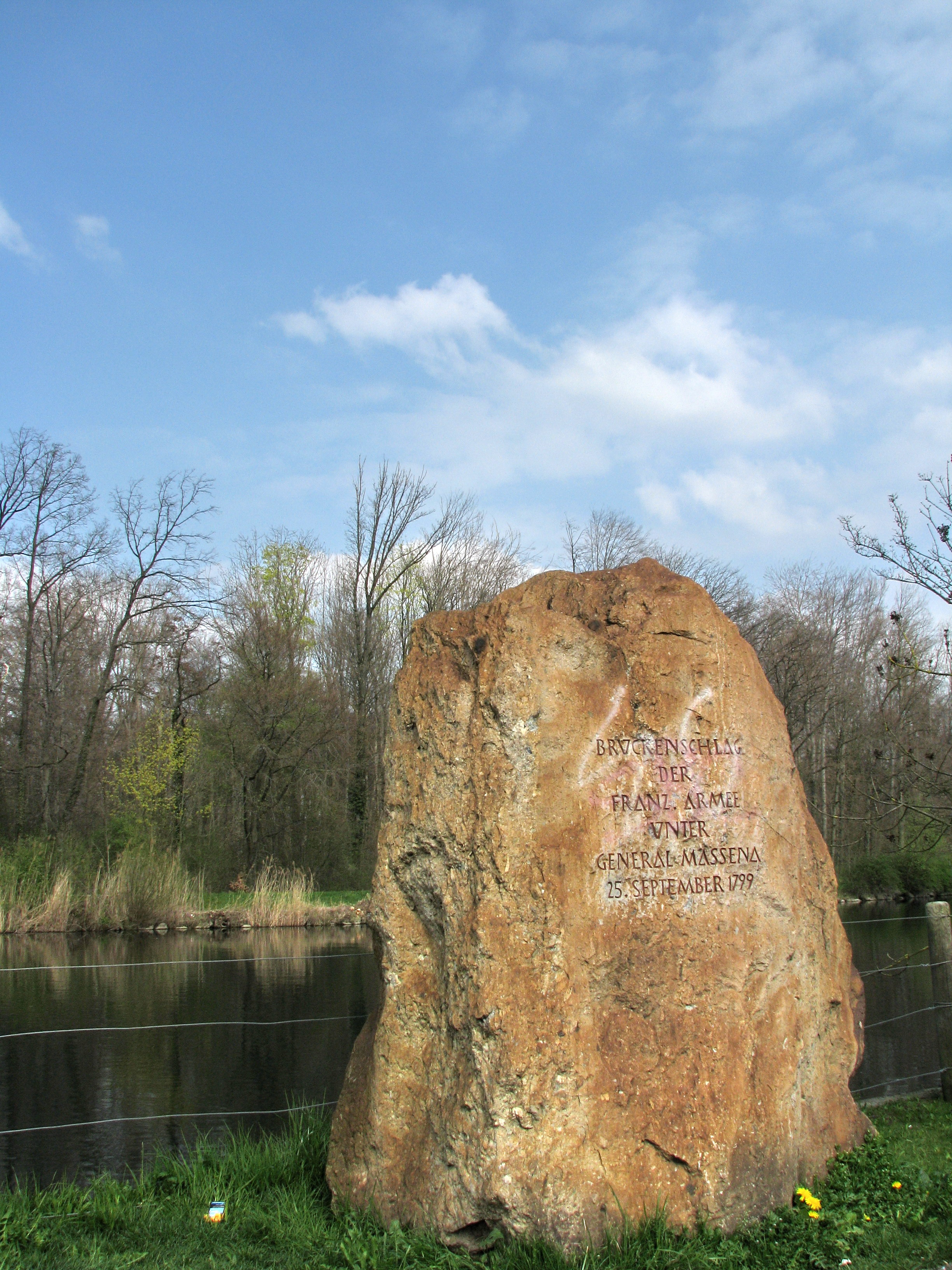
Memorial on Limmat river in Dietikon

The Second Battle of Zurich (25–26 September 1799) was a key victory by the Republican French army in Switzerland led by André Masséna over a Russian force commanded by Alexander Rimsky-Korsakov near Zürich, as it broke the stalemate that had resulted from the First Battle of Zurich three months earlier and led to the withdrawal of Russia from the Second Coalition. Masséna took full advantage of the incompetence of the Russian commander who had accidentally scattered his forces, and launched a bold assault. Most of the fighting took place on both banks of the river Limmat up to the gates of Zürich, and within the city itself. It was arguably the most significant French victory of 1799.

The same days saw a battle between Hotze's Austrians and Soult's French at the River Linth.

== Background ==
After the First Battle of Zurich Masséna had consolidated to a defensive line behind the lower reaches of the Aare River. At this time his entire army in Switzerland consisted of around 77,000 combatants, positioned as:

- 1st Division (Turreau) in the Upper Valais and the Simplon Pass.
- 2nd Division (Lecourbe) in the St Gotthard and the valley of the Reuss.
- 3rd Division (Soult) Right wing near Glarus, centre on the left bank of the Linth, the left near Adliswil on the Sihl.
- 4th Division (Mortier) on the Uetliberg.
- 5th Division (Lorge) on the left bank of the Limmat between Altstetten and Baden.
- 6th Division (Ménard) from Baden to the confluence of the Aare with the Rhine.
- 7th Division (Klein) formed the Reserve in the Frick-thal.
- 8th Division (Chabran) at Basel.

Following the overall strategic plan, the Austrian army under the Archduke Charles was to be augmented by the 25,000 man Russian command of Korsakov, newly arrived at Schaffhausen after a 90-day march.

Masséna meanwhile was preparing an offensive on his right flank against the Austrian positions in the Alps. On 15 and 16 August General Claude Lecourbe with 12,000 men drove the forces of Gottfried von Strauch and Joseph Anton von Simbschen from the St. Gotthard, Furka and Oberalp Passes in a series of violent assaults. As a distraction, on 14 August French forces under Soult made demonstrations across the Sihl below Zürich.

On the night of 16/17th Archduke Charles supported by Korsakov's troops launched a surprise attack over the river Aare at Gross-Döttingen using boats and pontoon bridges, but his engineers misjudged the strength of the current and depth of the river, the pontoon bridge was unable to be secured and eventually after serious fighting the attack was called off. Archduke Charles and Korsakov planned no further joint action however, as following the strategic plans of the Austrian Hofkriegsrat under Baron Thugut, Charles had been ordered to move his main command north into southern Germany. Reluctantly following these instructions, he left behind a column of 29,000 men under Friedrich von Hotze, and Korsakov's command with the Swiss in the Austrian service. The plan for these two commands was to wait for the arrival of the Russian column of Suvorov penetrating north from Italy over the Alpine passes and trap Masséna in a 3-point encirclement.

== French troops ==
The French troops which took part in the battle included:

- 23éme Régiment de Chasseurs à Cheval (Légion de Ardennes)
- 9éme Régiment de Hussards (la Liberté)
- 2éme Demi-Brigade d'Infanterie de Ligne
- 37éme Demi-Brigade d'Infanterie de Ligne
- 46éme Demi-Brigade d'Infanterie de Ligne (Deuxieme Formation)
- 57éme Demi-Brigade d'Infanterie de Ligne
- 102éme Demi-Brigade d'Infanterie de Ligne
- 10éme Demi-Brigade d'Infanterie de Ligne

== Initial situation ==
On 22 August Korsakov and Hotze agreed that the Russians with 22,000 men would line the lower reaches of the River Limmat (Aare), and Hotze with 20,000 men would occupy the Obersee region below Lake Zürich from the Linth to Glarus.

On 28 August the bulk of the troops of Archduke Charles departed Switzerland. Korsakov himself arrived in Zürich the following day, quickly displaying a vain over-confidence in the capabilities of his troops and disregard both for the French and his allies the Austrians:

The presumption and arrogance of Korsakoff were carried to such a pitch, that in a conference with the Archduke Charles, shortly before the battle [of Zürich], when that great general was pointing out the positions which should in an especial manner be guarded, and said, pointing to the map, "Here you should place a battalion." – "A company, you mean," said Korsakoff – "No," replied the Archduke, "a battalion." – "I understand you," rejoined the other; "an Austrian battalion, or a Russian company"

— Sir Archibald Alison.

At the end of August the Allied army stood as follows.

Rimsky-Korsakov with 33,000 men around Zürich and the Lower Limmat, distributed as:

- Division of Lieutenant-General Gorchakov (Korsakov's main body in the Camp of Sihlfeld, between the Uetliberg and Limmat):
  - Brigades of General-Major Tuchkov (6,314 men) and General-Major Essen (2,237 men) at Wollishofen. Total with gunners 10,330 men.
- Division of Lieutenant-General Durasov:
  - Brigade of General-Major Markov in a camp before Weiningen opposite Dietikon (2,000 grenadiers and 300 Cossacks)
  - Brigade of General-Major Pushchin in a camp at Würenlos and in front of the village of Wettingen: 2,500 infantry, 1,000 Cossacks (8 battalions, 10 squadrons). Along the right banks of the Limmat from Baden to the Rhine (1,000 men). Total with gunners 7,052 men.
- Reserve Division of Lieutenant-General Osten-Sacken, 5,700 men initially in a camp at Regensdorf, then along the north bank of Lake Zürich connecting to Hotze.
- The cavalry and Cossacks (3,000 men) under Major-General Gudovich were distributed on the Rhine along the line of the road from Zürich to Baden.

Nauendorf, with 5,400 Austrians, on the right bank of the Rhine between Waldshut and Basel.

Hotze with 25,000 Austrians, including 3,000 Swiss, from Uznach to Chur and Disentis.

Suvorov with 28,000 Russians on the march from Italy through the Alps.

Shortly before the battle Korsakov detached Osten-Sacken's 5,000 man Reserve Division to Rapperswil to reinforce Hotze in anticipation of Suvorov's approach, consequently weakening his defensive line along the Limmat before Zürich and exposing his line of communications.

The departure of Archduke Charles gave the French a momentary superiority in numbers, Masséna was determined to exploit this and the redistribution of Austrians and Russians. His aim was to beat Korsakov and Hotze before any intervention by Suvorov. On 30 August he attempted to cross the Aare and push back the enemy before Zürich. This river crossing was unsuccessful, and Masséna now planned a crossing near Dietikon with a subsequent attack on Korsakov in Zürich.

On 19 September, Masséna revealed his plan to his division commanders. Lorge's Division and part of Ménard's would cross the Limmat from Dietikon and attack Korsakov in Zürich. The remainder of Ménard's command would occupy the enemy by demonstrating at Vogelsang. At the same time Mortier's Division was to hold the attention of Korsakov's main body in front of Zürich by attacking Wollishofen. Klein was to cover the Alstetten road, while the Division of Soult was to cross the Linth at Bilten and prevent Hotze from assisting the Russians. All the boats available for transportation were assembled at Brugg, while a pontoon bridge was constructed at Rottenschwil to mislead the enemy as to the point of crossing. Since June, French boats had been gathered from different waters and transported over land and water. By September, 37 boats of different types were gathered in secret near Dietikon. Under cover of the night of 23/24 September General of the Artillery Dedon dismantled the pontoon bridge at Rottenschwil and transported it by convoy across the mountain to Dietikon.

On 24 September news came that Suvorov's troops had finally conquered the Gotthard Pass (see Battle of Gotthard Pass). This delayed success for the Russians made the joint attack of Korsakov, Hotze and Suvorov impossible, but it persuaded Masséna to bring forward his attack from 26 to 25 September.

== Battle ==
=== The crossing of the Limmat ===
On the evening of 24 September Masséna's troops concentrated at Dietikon amounted to more than 8,000 men of Lorge's infantry division and 26 guns, all laying silently in the vicinity of the river. On the other side of the Limmat between Würenlos and Wipkingen they were faced by only 2,600 Russians under Major General Markov, including 1,100 men under Markov himself in Oetwil Würenlos, 290 men and 2 guns of the Misinov Cossack regiment between the rise of the monastery drive and the pine woods, 220 men of a Grenadier Battalion on the western edge of the pine woods and four squadrons of dragoons, with 550 men under Colonel Dmitry Dmitrievich Shepelev at Wipkingen.

On 25 September at 04:45 as boats were rapidly launched across the Limmat the alarm was raised, and initial shots fired by a battalion of Gazan's Advance Guard Brigade signalled the beginning of the attack. With prompt efficiency approximately 600 men in 37 boats crossed the Limmat and formed a bridgehead on the opposite bank. The crossing of the boats alerted the weak Russian outposts on the opposite bank, but despite several rounds of musketry and artillery not a single boat was sunk, or a man drowned. At this point the Limmat sweeps back in a wide arc to the south, allowing Masséna's artillery to fire from both sides of the river bend on the landing and deeper beyond the bridgehead. 25 shots hit various buildings of the monastery. As more French crossed, firing from the left bank ceased in fear of hitting their own men, and all effort was placed into traversing the river.

At 05:00 Dedon directed the erection of the pontoon bridge. The French bridgehead was exposed to Russian artillery fire from the heights of Kloster-Fahr and the pine woods. This plateau, defended by seven guns and Markov's reserves was forthwith attacked, and after hard fighting by 06:00 the Russians were driven back, Markov wounded and taken prisoner. Barely an hour after the first shots the French had crossed 800 men and were in possession of the pine wood and the Russian camp. Behind them the pontoon bridge was rapidly assembled and completed at 07:30. By 09:00 the entire division of Lorge was on the right side of the Limmat with 8,000 men and a total of 26 guns.

Masséna aimed to prevent the Russian right wing under Durasov joining their left at Zürich, and now quickly sent Bontemps with his brigade to gain the slopes of the mountains of the Glatt and cut the communications between Regensberg and Zürich. Bontemps' left was covered by 2 battalions of Quétard's brigade on the Wurenlos road. All the other troops, some 15,000 men including the advance guard under Gazan, followed chief of staff Nicolas Oudinot in the direction of Höngg.

=== Mortier's attack ===
Meanwhile, at 05:00 Mortier's Division had launched its feint attacks against Korsakov's main command. His left under Brunet advanced to the small plateau at Wiedikon where they were soon pinned down by superior forces. His right under Drouet drove the Russians from Wollishofen, but were soon counter-attacked by Gorchakov's six battalions, assisted by William's flotilla of gunboats, and pushed back towards the Uetli.

Gorchakov however, not satisfied with merely repulsing the enemy attack, pursued the French to the Uetliberg and succeeded in capturing some batteries. This gain was however to contribute to the day's disaster, as the French success on the right bank, together with Klein's advance from Alstetten onto the Sihlfeld plane enfiladed the right of the Russian corps, obliging Korsakov to withdraw it at 13:00.

The Russians fought with their accustomed bravery, but they were not well directed, and it was pathetic to see them charging up the slopes of the Albis expecting to see Suvároff at the top and calling on his name

— Ramsay Weston Phipps.

Closely pursued as they retreated, Gorchakov's men suffered considerable loss.

=== Ménard's feint ===
The river crossing over the Limmat was successful as the Russians were too weak in their front section, and because they had been distracted away from Dietikon with feints by Mortier's Division at Wollishofen and Ménard's Division at Vogelsang. Ménard had succeeded in completely outwitting the Russians with his attack and also demonstrations against Brugg. From daybreak he had opened a barrage of artillery fire with all his guns in the vicinity of Baden and at the confluence of the Aare and Limmat against Durasov's forces, spread his remaining brigade out in full view of the enemy, and put into motion the remaining boats on the river. Durasov was completely duped by this, and stationed his troops nearly the entire day between Freienwil and Wurenlingen. By the time he realised his mistake and marched to rejoin troops on the heights of Oetlikon he found the passage barred by Bontemp's brigade, and had to make a substantial detour to Zürich, where he arrived late at night.

At Vogelsang Ménard succeeded in throwing a small detachment over the Limmat on boats transported overland from the Aare while under fire, this enabled him to re-establish a flying bridge, with which he crossed part of his command the next morning.

=== Battle closes on Zürich ===
In Zürich, Korsakov had felt his position secure to the extent that he had not made a single inspection of the line, nor had he removed his baggage or hospitals to a safe distance; instead, everything was left jumbled up in the city. Roused by the cannonade, he rode out to Höngg with a small detachment of troops and learned of Markov's defeat. Nevertheless, he was convinced that the crossing of the Limmat was merely a demonstration, and that the main threat came from Mortier's attack on Wollishofen.

By 10:00 the French were advancing on both banks of the Limmat supported by a heavy artillery barrage. Oudinot seized Höngg and the Wipkingen Heights from the weak detachment left by Korsakov, then, joined by part of the Reserve, at shortly before 15:00 he began attacking the Zürichberg, held by several Russian battalions. Gazan marched to Schwamendingen to cut the road to Winterthur. By this time Korsakov had finally become aware of his dangerous situation and withdrew troops from the right bank through Zürich to face the advancing Oudinot, however they could only do this by filing through the narrow streets of the town, jammed with wounded and baggage. A barrage of howitzer shells from the French further increased the confusion and impeded the Russians even more. By the time they had cleared Zürich it was too late, the French had gained the mountain on that side of town and on the plains took possession of the Beckenhof country house. The Russians attacked bravely, but could make no impression on the troops of Lorges, supported by the Helvetian Legion. In the meantime four Russian battalions sent back to Zürich by Hotze arrived, Korsakov put himself at their head and with the help of Bachmann's Swiss Legion drove back the French to the foot of the Heights of Wipkingen. Gazan however, held on at Schwamendingen. The Russian counterattacks against the Zürichberg, though incredibly brave, were inadequate in number and "instead of gaining the heights, the troops kept fighting before the gate, and charging the enemy with the bayonet among the vines and hedges, in a ground which did not admit of such an operation".

As night drew on Korsakov shut himself up in Zürich, having conceded the plains to the French. Masséna summoned the town but received no answer.

=== Soult's attack against Hotze ===
While all this was going on around Zürich, at the eastern end of Lake Zürich the Austrian corps of Hotze faced the French division of Jean-de-Dieu Soult in the channels and marshes around the lower Linth and the Walensee. For days beforehand Soult had dressed himself in an ordinary infantryman's uniform and performed outpost duty to observe the Austrian positions. The Battle of Linth River began at 02:30 on the 25th when a small group of soldiers, stripped to their underclothes, with pistols and ammunition tied above their heads and swords in their teeth, swam across the channel near Schänis. They were able to pull up rafts with ropes, and under the darkness and a thick mist which lingered all day, a whole battalion was ferried across before the alarm was raised. Similar crossings were made at Grynau Castle and Schmerikon. At 04:00 Hotze was awakened by the noise of artillery fire and rode out to find his troops fighting bravely at Schänis. He then rode with his chief of staff towards Weesen to reconnoitre, but in the fog they ran into French troops concealed in a wood. As the two Austrians turned to flee they opened fire and both men were shot dead. News of the death of Hotze spread quickly and the dismayed Austrians now under the hapless command of Franz Petrasch fell back towards Lichtensteig, abandoning their small flotilla of boats at Rapperswil.

Further east on Soult's right flank, Gabriel Jean Joseph Molitor's brigade had been attacked by the Austrian far left flank columns under Franz Jellacic and Friedrich von Linken on the upper Linth. The two Austrians were unaware of the fate of Hotze's and Korsakov's forces and out of touch with each other. The French 84th Line Infantry demi-brigade held on behind the Linth all through 25 September, then counter-attacked on the following day. Encouraged by the defeat of Hotze, Molitor's men drove Jellacic's Austrians back towards Walenstadt. On the 25th, Linken's column appeared in the Sernftal, surprising and capturing two battalions of the French 76th Line Infantry. Linken's troops, which consisted of Joseph Anton von Simbschen's brigade, soon found themselves opposed by a battalion of the 84th Line. By 27 September, Molitor attacked Linken after being reinforced by two of Soult's battalions, but the fighting was inconclusive. On 29 September after more skirmishing, Linken gave the order to retreat to the Rhine valley after receiving a misleading note from a double agent and not getting any other news from Suvorov or Hotze.

=== Actions on 26 September ===
During the night Korsakov was finally joined by Durasov's troops, and by the corps returned by Hotze from the Linth. Now mustering 16 battalions Korsakov was determined to hold his position at Zurich until he could be joined by Suvorov. That morning he received the news of the death of Hotze.

Facing the Russians, Oudinot assembled all the troops on the right bank to attack the Zürichberg – Bontemp's brigade was to block the Winterthur road on the left. Lorge was to march along the Limmat to connect with the attacks of Klein and Mortier, who in their turn would advance by the Sihlfeld with Masséna at their head. By cutting the retreat of the Russians they would be driven into the lake.

At dawn the Russians launched a powerful attack against Lorge's Division in two lines which succeeding in driving back Bontem's brigade and re-taking the Winterthur Road, thus foiling the plan to drive them into the lake. This was very fortunate for Korsakov, as at that moment Klein and Mortier were bombarding Klein Zürich, and Oudinot's ordinance breaking in the Höngg gate. Terrible confusion reigned in the confines of the town, Korsakov proposed a parley, but no one paid any attention. Instead the Russians began a general retreat, leaving only a weak rearguard in the town. Though he made no effort to prevent the withdrawal, Masséna advanced Dedon's light artillery to successive positions to fire on the left flank of the retreating column, which spread complete disorder through their ranks. Masséna then ordered Lorge, Bontems and Gazan to charge the centre of the Russians, who defended themselves with desperation. Generals Sacken and Likotsuchin were severely wounded, the troops fought in isolated pockets without cohesion of any sort.

At the same time Oudinot broke through the Limmat gate, still defended by the Russian rearguard, while Klein stormed through Klein Zürich with the Reserve.

There was no pursuit and the Russians were able to retreat without further interference, however Korsakov determined to continue withdrawing with undiminished speed as far as the Rhine, and beyond. Wickham claims that the greater part of the Russian command were able to reach Eglisau unmolested by the French. Nevertheless, of an original force of more than 25,000 men, Korsakov finally reached the Rhine with 10,000 remnants via Bülach and Eglisau, having lost his baggage train, guns and military chest and records.

== Assessment ==
"Massena's sudden attack at the second battle of Zurich was hailed as a masterpiece of surprise and prior planning." John Elting Swords Around A Throne p. 336

Soult spent several nights dressed as a private studying crossing sites. ibid p. 708

"It is Massena's greatest achievement as a soldier." Marengo and Hohenlinden James Arnold p. 10

The defeat of Korsakov came about through a combination of careful planning by the French and poor leadership on the part of the Russians. On his arrival at the front Korsakov had made no personal reconnaissances, but gave himself over to comfortable existence in Zürich and relied entirely on a misplaced faith in the superiority of his troops to all others. Masséna described him as "more of a courtier than a soldier". Equally, the very rigid linear style of fighting the Russians had developed in their wars against the Ottoman Empire stood against them in this terrain against the more fluid French. Accustomed as they were to seize victory by aggressive bayonet advances to their front, it never occurred to them that they might be outflanked. Korsakov and Petrasch have also been strongly criticised for their rapid withdrawal over the Rhine despite very little pursuit by the French and in full knowledge that Suvorov was struggling to join them from the south.

The Republican victory was undoubtedly Masséna's greatest triumph, however he too has been criticised for failing to fully exploit his success. Rocquancourt, Jomini and the Archduke Charles question why Masséna on the evening of the 25th, when it became clear the Russians were concentrating against Oudinot, did not move up all of Klein's reserve and the remains of Ménard's Division to support the left wing and hence surround the Russians. Nevertheless, the action remains a brilliant feat of arms for the French.

== Aftermath ==
Masséna, aware of Suvorov's advance toward St. Gotthard, quickly shifted his troops southward. Lecourbe's division had already performed heroics in delaying the Russians at the St. Gotthard Pass, and later at the spectacular crossing over the Reuss at the Devil's Bridge. When Suvorov finally forced the Reuss he was met by units of Soult's division blocking the route at Altdorf. Unable to break through the French lines and aware of Korsakov's disastrous defeat, the Russian general turned east through the high and difficult Pragel Pass to Glarus, where he was dismayed to find other French troops awaiting him on 4 October. Masséna tried to defeat Suvorov, but the latter defeated him at Battle of Muottental, and then captured the important city of Glarus, which allowed him to calmly leave the encirclement. Russians have lost their baggage and artillery, and losing as many as 5,000 men. On 15 October the last Coalition troops left Swiss territory, which therefore returned to the control of the Helvetic Republic.

After the French victory Russia pulled out of the Second Coalition. The French extended their control of the territory of the Confederation and created favourable conditions for the attack on Austria. Under accusations of looting Masséna requisitioned enormous quantities of food, livestock and feed as well as soldiers and money. Want and misery dominated in the war-affected areas. The Second Coalition War had greatly weakened the Helvetic Republic, the consequent loss of popular support led ultimately to the 1803 Act of Mediation. On the Zürichberg up a short forest trail and a monument to Masséna and the French. On the monument in the forest both battles of Zürich are briefly described. There is another commemorative memorial at Langnau am Albis south of Zürich to the defence of the Albis pass. In Paris the village names of Dietikon and Muta Thal are chiselled on the Arc de Triomphe. In Schöllenenschlucht (near the Devil's Bridge) is a monument to the Alpine crossing of the Russians under Suvorov.

== Sources ==
- Alison, Sir Archibald (1835), History of Europe from the commencement of the French revolution in 1789, to the restoration of the Bourbons in 1815, vol. IV (2nd ed.), W. Blackwood and Sons, p. 132
- Bodart, Gaston (1908). Militär-historisches Kriegs-Lexikon (1618–1905). Vienna and Leipzig: C. W. Stern.
- Bogdanovich, Modest (1846). Движение Суворова к Гларусу [Suvorov's move to Glarus]. Походы Суворова в Италии и Швейцарии [The campaigns of Suvorov in Italy and Switzerland] (in Russian). St. Petersburg: Военная типография.
- Clausewitz, Carl von (2020). Napoleon Absent, Coalition Ascendant: The 1799 Campaign in Italy and Switzerland. Vol. 1. Translated by Murray, Nicholas; Pringle, Christopher. Lawrence: University Press of Kansas. ISBN 978-0-7006-3025-7.
- Clausewitz, Carl von (2021). The Coalition Crumbles, Napoleon Returns: The 1799 Campaign in Italy and Switzerland. Vol. 2. Translated by Murray, Nicholas; Pringle, Christopher. Lawrence: University Press of Kansas. ISBN 978-0-7006-3034-9.
- Clodfelter, M. (2017). Warfare and Armed Conflicts: A Statistical Encyclopedia of Casualty and Other Figures, 1492–2015 (4th ed.). Jefferson, NC: McFarland. ISBN 978-0-7864-7470-7.
- Duffy, Christopher (1999), Eagles over the Alps: Suvorov in Italy and Switzerland, 1799, Emperor's Press
- Eggenberger, David (1985). An Encyclopedia of Battles. New York: Dover Publications. ISBN 0-486-24913-1.
- Phipps, Ramsay Weston (1926), The Armies of the First French Republic and the Rise of the Marshals of Napoleon I, vol. V.
- Shadwell, Maj.-Gen. Lawrence (1875), Mountain Warfare – Illustrated by the Campaign of 1799 in Switzerland, London: Henry S. King & Co.
- Suvorov, Alexander Vasilyevich (2023) [1806]. Наука побеждать [The Science of Victory]. Эксклюзивная классика (revised ed.). Moscow: AST. ISBN 978-5-17-157345-4.
- Tucker, Spencer C. (2009). A Global Chronology of Conflict: From the Ancient World to the Modern Middle East [6 volumes]: From the Ancient World to the Modern Middle East. ABC-CLIO. ISBN 978-1851096725.

Preceded by Battle of Gotthard Pass	French Revolution: Revolutionary campaigns Second Battle of Zurich	Succeeded by Battle of Muottental
