= Claude Lecourbe =

French soldier (1759–1815)

Claude Jacques Lecourbe
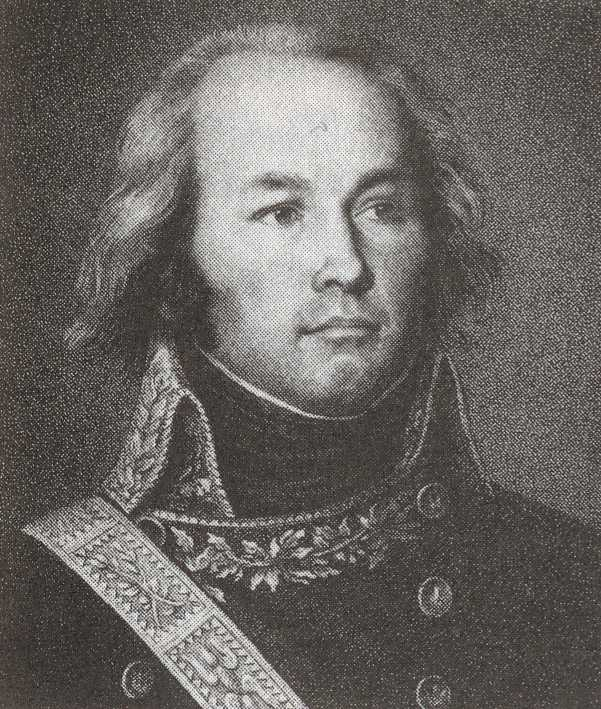
- Portrait by Jean-Urbain Guérin, 1802
- Born: 22 February 1758; Besançon, Franche-Comté, France
- Died: 22 October 1815 (aged 57); Belfort, France
- Military career
- Allegiance: France
- Branch: Army
- Service years: 1777–1785; 1789–1804; 1814–1815
- Rank: General of Division
- Conflicts: American Revolutionary War; French Revolutionary Wars; Battle of Amsteg; Battle of Gotthard Pass; Battle of Stockach; Battle of Neuburg; Napoleonic Wars
- Awards: Legion of Honour (Grand Cross)

Claude Jacques Lecourbe (French pronunciation: [klod ʒak ləkuʁb]; 22 February 1759 – 22 October 1815) was a French general during the French Revolutionary and Napoleonic wars. He was especially famed for his conduct in Switzerland and as a subordinate of General Jean Victor Marie Moreau.

He fell out of favour with Napoleon as a result of his closeness with Moreau and was out of service for a decade until recalled by the Bourbons where he would briefly attempt to stop Napoleon's restoration before switching sides and taking command of the defence of Belfort in 1815.

He would die soon after but before his death he gave testimony that would be used in the trial of Marshal Ney.

== Early life ==
=== Birth and Family ===
Born in Besançon, Franche-Comté, on February 22, 1758, he was declared the illegitimate child of Tiennette Vuillemot, on the baptismal certificate but this was amended in 1761, by request of Claude-Guillaume Courbe, and his wife Marie Valette, whose marriage had been celebrated on 15 August 1761, declaring that Tiennette Vuillemot's son was indeed their child, and that they had not had their names entered in the birth register for reasons of propriety.

His father Claude-Guillaume was a cavalry officer who had received the Order of Saint Louis for his service to the Kingdom of France but by the time of his baptismal certificate change he had retired.

=== Enlistment as a private soldier ===
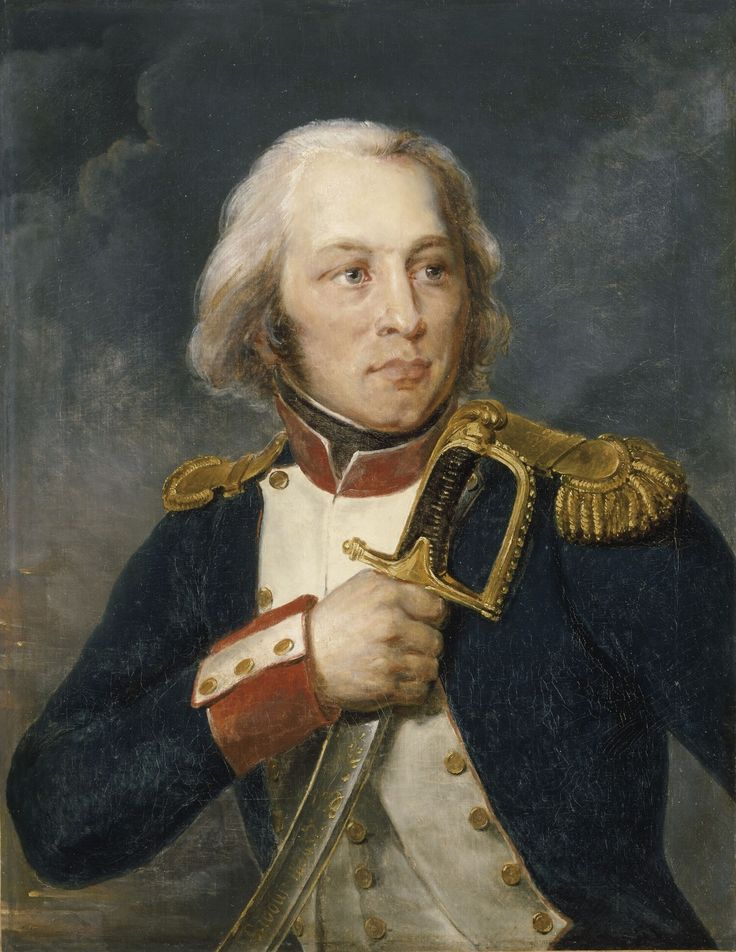
Claude-Jacques Lecourbe, lieutenant-colonel of the 7th Jura Battalion, by Esprit-Aimé Libour (1834)

Young Lecourbe studied at Poligny and Lons-le-Saunier but left school in 1777, refusing to submit himself to punishment, and enlisted in the Aquitaine Regiment. He served in the regiment for eight years; seeing action in the European theatre of the American War of Independence – in the Great Siege of Gibraltar and the capture of Minorca. He was promoted to corporal in 1780 and was discharged on July 29, 1785.

== Early French revolutionary war military career ==
=== The Army of the North ===
In August 1789, at the start of the French Revolution, Lecourbe became the commander of the National Guard of Ruffey-sur-Seille (Jura). In 1790 he was chosen to represent Jura at the Fête de la Fédération, celebrating first anniversary of the revolution.

Lecourbe joined the Army of the North and was rapidly promoted, first to captain in the 7th Volunteer Battalion of Jura, then becoming its Chief of Battalion in November 1791. As a lieutenant-colonel, Lecourbe took part in the capture of Porrentruy in April 1792. With a transfer to the Army of the North, Lecourbe would see significant action in 1793 in the Low countries theatre, fighting at Herzeele and Hondschoote on 6–8 September before being wounded by a cannon shot to the left thigh at the First Battle of Courtrai. Lecourbe would recover and distinguished himself at Wattignies latter in the year.

=== Counter-insurgency and suspicion in the Vendée ===
In November 1793 Lecourbe, along with his battalion, would be sent to the Vendée to aim in countering the growing royalist insurgency. However Lecourbe would be denounced by four fellow officers and accused of moderation on December 6. He was arrested on orders of Representative Ernest Dominique François Joseph Duquesnoy the next day and was sent to Amiens before transferring to Nantes prison to await trial. Lecourbe would be unanimously acquitted by the Revolutionary Tribunal of Nantes on 13 April 1794, and then would rejoin his battalion at Amiens.

=== Actions as general of brigade 1794–1797 ===
Transferred to the Army of the Moselle soon after his return, Lecourbe would make general of brigade on 20 May 1794, and would command the 2nd Brigade on the right wing under François Séverin Marceau at the Battle of Fleurus, where Lecourbe would once more be lauded for his actions.

Joining the Army of Sambre-et-Meuse Lecourbe would beat Habsburg General Johann Peter Beaulieu at Sombreffe, capture Namur, and see action at the battles of the Ourthe, Roer and then at the siege of Luxembourg.

Lecourbe's rank of general of brigade would be confirmed by the Committee of Public Safety in June 1795. He transferred back to the Army of the Rhine and Moselle, joined the siege of Mainz and then was involved in covering the retreat from the failed attempt on the city in late October.

He briefly was without a command before General Moreau assigned him a brigade in General Alexandre Camille Taponier's division in May 1796. In that capacity he fought at Ettlingen and Neresheim. He repelled the Austrians during the Erlenheim Island affair, on 2 December. There, during the Siege of Kehl, he was stationed on the Erlenheim island in the Rhine river. He destroyed a French pontoon bridge to prevent his men from retreating, then grabbed a standard and rallied a battalion to counterattack the Austrians. Moving to Guillaume Philibert Duhesme's division, he would fight at further attempts to cross the Rhine in the following year, at Diersheim and Renchen. In 1798 Lecourbe would spend time in the Army of England, seeing little action since the invasion of Britain didn't materialise. In November he was transferred to the Army of Helvetia.

== Swiss campaign (1799) ==
In February 1799 the French invasion of Switzerland began, aiming to secure access to important mountain passes between Switzerland and newly conquered territory in northern Italy as well as the Cisalpine Republic, a French client state. The invasion was successful for the French with many in Switzerland either embracing the revolution or not resisting.

Lecourbe was made a general of division by the Directory shortly after the invasion began. Habsburg Austria would seek to contest French control and Lecourbe would take part in clashes in the far west of Switzerland in Grisons, commanding the right wing of the army during operations in Engadine. On 12 March Lecourbe captured the castle at Finstermünz [De], taking 1,300 prisoners. He would be victorious again at Martinsbruck on the 15th.

France would see reverses with Jourdan's Army of the Danube defeated by Archduke Charles to the north of Switzerland in the Battle of Stockach at the end of May. Lecourbe was forced to retreat behind the Reuss river at the end of April. During the campaigns in Switzerland Lecourbe would command a young Michel Ney, whom he would commend for his defensive actions. The Habsburg advance would continue with Archduke Charles retakeing Zurich in early June.

Lecourbe was not present at Zurich. Instead ordered to the south of Switzerland, Lecourbe would win at Wasenbach and Amsteg and suffered a wound to his arm. In August his division secured the Saint-Gothard, Grimsel, Furka and Oheralp mountain passes.

His arrival was timely as the Russo-Austrian Italian expedition turned north to Switzerland. Lecourbe fought delaying actions against Russian General Alexander Suvorov. The Battle of Gotthard Pass delayed the Russian advance and contributed to the French victory at the second Battle of Zürich.

After the allied defeat at Zurich and the Russian offensive failing, Lecourbe would pursue them but failed to encircle Suvorov's army, following them to Glarus and re-occupying the Reuss and Glarus valleys.

== Army of the Rhine ==
Lecourbe would be appointed provisional commander-in-chief of the Army of the Rhine in place of Moreau, September 25, 1799. Lecourbe tendered his resignation but was refused by Directory. He then led his army in a crossing attempt in late October, capturing Heilbronn and Pforheim before defeating General Artúr Görgey on the Neckar the next month, however he was forced to fall back despite winning the field.

Lecourbe would resign command of the Army of the Rhine on 5 December and be appointed 2nd-in-command to General Moreau.

In 1800, Lecoubre was victorious in the battle of Stockach, the Battle of Neuburg and played a part in the French victory at the Battle of Hohenlinden. Then pursuing the Austrians following their defeat with sharp actions at Rosenheim; at Salzburg Archduke John held off Lecourbe in a successful rear-guard action. However the Austrian army began to lose cohesion after a series of actions, including Kremsmünster where Lecourbe was in command. With the French army only 80 km from Vienna the Austrian Army was in no state to stop Moreau's army, leading to the Treaty of Lunéville and the end of Austrian participation in the War of the Second Coalition.

== Disgrace under the Empire ==
Moreau and Claude Lecoubre returned to Paris in 1802, but Moreau's success in the Rhine campaign made him a rival in fame and in military glory to Napoleon himself.

Lecourbe's friendship with General Moreau and his vocal defence of the latter in the trial of Georges Cadoudal would place his position at risk. During the trial Lecourbe entered into the court, leading a little boy whom he raised up. He exclaimed, with considerable emotion, "Soldiers, behold the son of your general!". This event visibly affected many soldiers in attendance. This event as well as the conduct of Lecourbe's brother, the judge Jacques François Lecourbe, brought on the enmity of Bonaparte.

Claude Lecourbe would be forced into retirement in 1804 with the minimum required pension. He would return to Ruffey-sur-Seille where he took up farming and had a château built for himself. During his enforced exile, in September 1813 when Moreau entered the service of France's enemy the Russian Empire, Lecourbe would have his movements restricted to Bourges and be placed under police surveillance .

== Return to favour, the Hundred Days and death ==
After Napoleon's abdication in 1814, Lecourbe was made a count by King Louis XVIII. The Count of Artois recalled Lecourbe to active duty in February 1815 and made him inspector-general of the 6th Military Division, headquartered in Besançon.

Lecourbe was tasked with preventing Napoleon's return to Paris after he left Elba. He was appointed a subordinate to Marshal Ney alongside fellow General Louis-Auguste-Victor Bourmont, a staunch royalist. Lecourbe, whose own politics were strongly republican, equally opposed Ney's eventual decision to switch sides, complaining that his removal from military command in 1805 had been a personal affront to his honour. Nevertheless, he attended a parade in which Ney read a proclamation from Napoleon to the assembled troops.

Upon Napoleon's return, Lecourbe would begrudgingly offer his services "to defend a threatened France" and during the Hundred Days he commanded the Army of the Jura (I Corps of Observation), operating in the Jura against Archduke Ferdinand. With an army of only 13,600, most of which were mobilised national guards, he held the city of Belfort for 15 days against 24,500 Austrians. Other sources give the number of the Austrians at 40,000. Lecourbe would only agree to a ceasefire with General Colloredo-Mansfeld on 11 July 1815. For his actions at Belfort then Minister of war Louis-Nicolas Davout would suggest making Lecoubre a Marshal of the Empire but this would not occur.

After Louis's second restoration, Lecourbe would retire and receive a 6,000 franc pension before dying on 22 October 1815 in Belfort from a bladder infection after a long illness.

Before his death, Lecourbe gave testimony to a magistrate that was read at the trial of Marshal Ney. He confirmed it was Ney, and not Bourmont or himself, who had decided to switch sides and support Napoleon during the Hundred Days. However Lecourbe also contradicted Bourmont's testimony that Ney's roughly 5,000 soldiers of questionable loyalty would have been able to stop Napoleon's force of over 14,000 men.

== Legacy ==
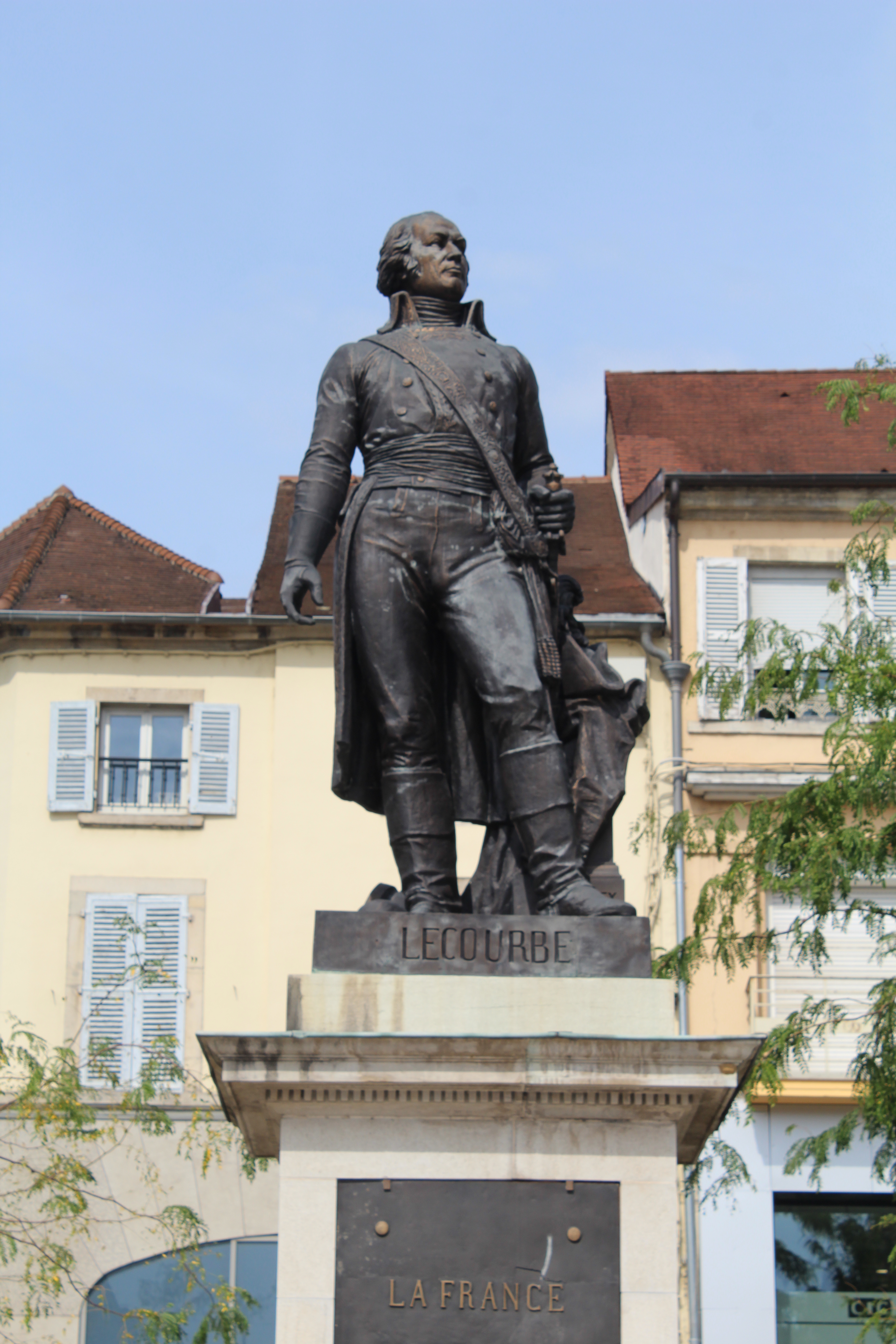
The Lecourbe statue in Lons-le-Saunier. Antoine Etex, 1853

Former private secretary to the Emperor turned Bourbon supporter Louis Antoine Fauvelet de Bourrienne described "Lecourbe was a distinguished General, specially famed for mountain warfare" in his Mémoires sur Napoléon.

Streets named in Lecourbe's honour can also be found in Paris and Besançon.

In Belfort, a statue commemorates Lecoubre as "The glorious defender of the city", as part of a monument [Fr] dedicated to the three sieges Belfort underwent in the 1800s. Lecourbe is honoured alongside General Claude Juste Alexandre Legrand, commander of the 1813–14 siege that lead to the 1814 invasion of France, and Colonel Pierre Philippe Denfert-Rochereau who commanded the defence during the 1870–71 siege in the Franco-Prussian War.

Another statue by Antonine Etex made in 1853 commemorating Lecourbe, standing in the Place de la Liberté in Lons-le-Saunier, was donated by Napoleon III's government in 1854. On the side of the statue are scenes depicting battles in the 1815 Jura campaign.

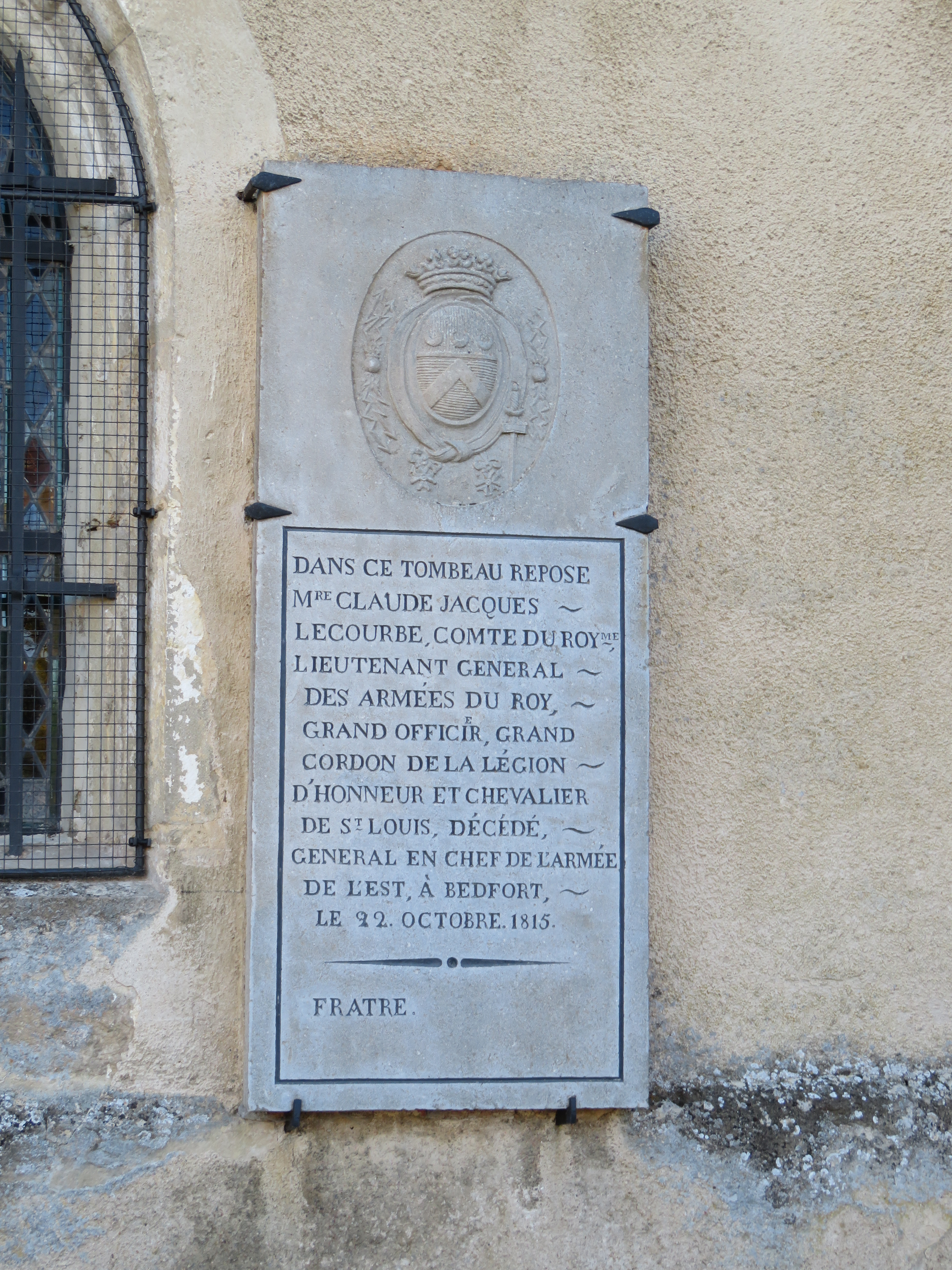
Plaque on the tomb of General Lecourbe, Ruffey-sur-Seille

The name "LECOURBE" is inscribed on the east side of the Arc de Triomphe.

== Honours ==
- Grand Cross of the Legion of Honour, 23 August 1814.
- Peer of the Empire, 2 June 1815
