= Bontemps =

Bontemps is a surname of French origin, meaning "good time".

Individuals with the name "Bontemps" include:

== Artists and writers ==
- Arna Bontemps, novelist
  - the Bontemps African American Museum, named for him
- Georges Bontemps, artistic glassmaker
- Jongnic Bontemps, film and TV composer
- Pierre Bontemps, 17th-century sculptor

== Athletes ==
- Doriane Bontemps, ice dancer
- Jorge Bontemps, footballer
- Julien Bontemps, sailor
- Ron Bontemps, basketball player
- Paul Bontemps, athlete

== Fictional characters ==
- Roger Bontemps, the personification of leisure time

== Others ==
- Alexandre Bontemps, 17th-century courtier
- Blaise Bontems, 19th-century designer of automata
- Jean Bontemps, privateer
- Napoléon Joseph Louis Bontemps, colonial governor

== See also ==
- Bon Temps, Louisiana, the fictional setting of the True Blood series on HBO, and of Southern Vampire Mysteries series of novels on which it is based
- the phrase Laissez les bons temps rouler, which literally translates to "let the good times roll"
