= Joseph Anton von Simbschen =

- Born: 6 October 1746; Siebendorf, Holy Roman Empire
- Died: 14 January 1820 (aged 73) Vienna, Austrian Empire
- Allegiance: (Habsburg monarchy) Habsburg Austria; Austrian Empire
- Branch: Cavalry
- Service years: 1761–1815, 1818–1820
- Rank: Feldzeugmeister
- Conflicts: War of the Bavarian Succession; Austro-Turkish War (1788–1791); War of the First Coalition; Battle of Loano; Battle of Limburg; Battle of Neuwied; War of the Second Coalition; Battle of Stockach; First Battle of Zurich; Battle of Amsteg; Battle of Caldiero
- Awards: Order of Maria Theresa, KC 1806

Joseph Anton von Simbschen (6 October 1746 – 14 January 1820) served in the Austrian army during the War of the First Coalition as a staff officer in Italy. He rose in rank to general officer and fought at Loano, Limburg, and Neuwied. During the War of the Second Coalition in 1799 he led the Austrian forces at Amsteg in Switzerland and later earned promotion to Feldmarschall-Leutnant. He led a division during the German campaign in 1800. His actions at Caldiero in 1805 earned him the Order of Maria Theresa. Simbschen was seen as a braggart and loudmouth, qualities which earned him many enemies. When his friend Archduke Charles, Duke of Teschen resigned from the army in 1809, Simbschen's enemies pounced; he was court-martialed, cashiered, and sentenced to house arrest in 1813. The Aulic War Council imposed a harsher prison sentence in 1815, but in 1818 his military rank and awards were restored.

== Early career ==
Simbschen was in 1746 at Siebendorf in Transylvania, the son of colonel Karl Joseph, commander in the Slavonian Military Frontier guards since 1753, the second Inhaber of the Infantry Regiment No. 53, who died in 1763 while a general (feldzeugmeister) of the Temes Banat troops.

In 1761, Joseph Anton joined the Infantry Regiment No. 26–Puebla de Portugalo as a cadet. In 1762 he was appointed lieutenant in the Hussar Regiment No. 13–Szécheny. In the War of the Bavarian Succession (1778/79) he served as a captain in the General Staff under feldzeugmeister Karl Leopold vom Stain, participating in the Saxony campaign in 1778–79 and attended the evacuation of the redoubts at Gießhübl and the meeting of Weißkirchen. After the Treaty of Teschen (13 May 1779), he was transferred to the Ottochan Border Infantry Regiment. In June 1783 he was promoted to major and in 1786 to naval commander in Zengg, where he built up the fleet. Simbschen was the interpreter for Austrian heir Francis during his travel to Fiume in spring 1788, as he spoke Serbo-Croatian.

=== Austro-Turkish War ===
When the Austro-Turkish War broke out in 1788, Simbschen was assigned to the General Staff, and promoted in quick succession to lieutenant colonel (1789), colonel (1790) and quartermaster-general. He took part in the capture of Dubicza and Novi, then fought at Begorstan on 9 August 1788 and organised the relief of Cetingrad until 11 July 1790. After the end of the war, he came to the Banat at short notice as commander of the 1st Banal Frontier Infantry Regiment.

=== Coalition Wars ===
At the outbreak of the War of the First Coalition in April 1792, he came to the Italian Mediterranean coast as quartermaster-general of the Lombard Army under feldzeugmeister Joseph Nikolaus de Vins. On 9 December 1795 he was formally given the rank major-general, originally receiving it on 22 May 1794. Until 1795 he organized the battles of Dego, Monte Settepani and Loano as Chief-of-Staff, and he also led the conquest of the fortifications of Rivièra di Ponente, San Giacomo, Vado, Finale and Madonna della Neve. On 24 June 1795 he maintained his position with Giuliano Torrente on the Ligurian coast. In 1796, he participated at Wetzlar (15–16 June), Kirchheim, Friedberg (Hesse), Limburg an der Lahn and Neuwied. He successfully defended Mainz from the French, then pushed them back at Wiesbaden and took over Diez and Bingen. He led the reserve corps in 1797, participating at Limburg, Wiesbaden and Königstein, and finally stopped French looting of Frankfurt am Main. The War of the First Coalition ended in the collapse of the Coalition and French victory.

In the War of the Second Coalition, he distinguished himself commanding an independent corps at Liptingen-Stockach (25–26 March 1799), then advanced to Kehl, the Rhine and drove the enemy out of Rottweil, Offenburg and Freudenstadt. At Stein, he crossed the Rhine with the vanguard of Archduke Charles and witnessed the battles at Winterthur and Andelfingen. On 7 June 1799, he took part with his troops in the First Battle of Zurich. After the unification with the Russians under Marshal Suvorov, he covered his retreat. Simbschen defended the canton of Uri, fought for the Devil's Bridge and then returned to Glarus through Graubünden. With the patent of 6 March 1800, he was promoted to field marshal-lieutenant on 10 September 1799 and acted as inspector of the German imperial troops. In the winter campaign of 1800, he commanded a detachment corps of 10,000 men in the area of Bamberg and Forchheim. He threw back the enemy troops under division general Augereau at Höchst, Spessart, Geroldshofen and Pommersfelden. He then defeated a French division under general Duhesme at Neunkirchen am Brand, covered the Upper Palatinate and lifted the siege of Würzburg.

In 1805 he served as a major-general in Italy, and between 29 and 31 October he commanded the right wing under Archduke Charles in the Battle of Caldiero. On October 28, 1805, general Heinrich von Bellegarde ordered him to defend the trenches on the heights of Colognola Alta. Zimbschen had under him the command of 8 infantry regiments, 5 border guard battalions and 8 squadrons. In the battle against the French-Italian Army under marshal Massena, he successfully defended the entrenchments from Belfiore di Porcile to Ilasi for three days against the stubborn attacks of general Molitor's French division.

=== Later years ===
For his military services in Italy, he was awarded the Knight's Cross of the Order of Maria Theresa on 28 May 1806. On 18 November 1806, he was appointed Inhaber of the 43rd Infantry Regiment in recognition of his 45 years of service. In 1806 he was appointed major-general in Agram, where he stayed for barely a year. In June 1807 he was promoted to commander-general in Slavonia based in Peterwardein, succeeding aged feldzeugmeister Baron von Geneyne, who had held this position for sixteen years. In July 1809, Emperor Franz appointed him President of the General Military Court of Appeal against his will, and on 3 August he was promoted to feldzeugmeister. When the 43rd Regiment was disbanded as a result of the Treaty of Schönbrunn, the Emperor awarded him the newly vacated 48th Infantry Regiment on 23 November 1809.

Simbschen was a contact to the Serbian revolutionaries under Karađorđe, that fought against the Ottomans since 1804. In March 1808, Simbschen sent his trustee to Belgrade who on 8 April met with Karađorđe and handed over Austrian financial aid for the uprising. When the Serbs were defeated at Nish in June 1809, Karađorđe asked for Serbia to become an Austrian protectorate, and promised to hand over the Danube line of Belgrade-Smederevo-Šabac in return. Austria were unwilling to upset Russia, a Serbian ally, and the Porte, thus Metternich rejected the proposal. This failure shook the position of Simbschen, who was relieved of the Peterwardein general command and summoned to Vienna with decree dated 24 October 1810. His request for retirement was approved in November 1810.

Simbschen was arrested in August 1812, but it was not until December 1813 that the court martial in Vienna brought charges of alleged embezzlement of funds. It soon turned out that his total fortune amounted to only about 36,000 gulden, mostly from the former marriage estate of his wife Rosalie and earlier savings. Staff auditor Gavenda tried to relieve Simbschen of his position as feldzeugmeister, to deprive him of the Order of Maria Theresa including his pension and to impose a four-year prison sentence on him, and the court martial sentenced him to one year's imprisonment on 12 July 1815. Simbschen presented the Prince of Schwarzenberg with a letter of justification, which refuted the machinations of the court martial against him. It was not until 1 August 1818 that Simbschen was reinstated in the old feldzeugmeister batch with an annual pension of 4000 gulden, and the Order of Maria Theresa including the previously enjoyed order pension was also refunded. He enjoyed his rehabilitation only for a short time and died in Vienna in 1820 at the age of 74.

== Family ==
Baron Joseph Anton married in 1782 to Rosalie von Wagner, a landowner's daughter from the Cheb region, and their children later all became officers:

- Joseph (1783–1824), colonel (1814) ⚭ Anna von Falge (1795–1867)
- Ferdinand (1795–1873), Field Marshal-Lieutenant (1849) ⚭ Karoline von Munitillo (1802–1853)
- Karl (1794–1870), field marshal-lieutenant (1854)
- Wilhelmine (24 February 1788 – 30 November 1852)

== Sources ==
- Arnold, James R. (2005). Marengo & Hohenlinden: Napoleon's Rise to Power. Barnsley, South Yorkshire: Pen and Sword. ISBN 1-84415-279-0.
- Duffy, Christopher (1999). Eagles Over the Alps: Suvarov in Italy and Switzerland, 1799. Chicago, Ill.: The Emperor's Press. ISBN 1-883476-18-6.
- Hirtenfeld, J. (1857). "Der Militär-Maria-Theresien-Orden und seine Mitglieder: Nach Authentischen Quellen Bearbeitet" (in German). Vienna: Kaiserlich-Königlichen.
- Phipps, Ramsay Weston (2011) [1939]. The Armies of the First French Republic and the Rise of the Marshals of Napoleon I: The Armies of the Rhine in Switzerland, Holland, Italy, Egypt, and the Coup d'Etat of Brumaire (1797–1799). Vol. 5. Pickle Partners Publishing. ISBN 978-1-908692-28-3.
- Pivka, Otto von (1979). Armies of the Napoleonic Era. New York, N.Y.: Taplinger Publishing. ISBN 0-8008-5471-3.
- Smith, Digby (1998). The Napoleonic Wars Data Book. London: Greenhill. ISBN 1-85367-276-9.
- Smith, Digby; Kudrna, Leopold (2008). "Austrian Generals of 1792-1815: Simbschen, Joseph Anton Freiherr von". napoleon-series.org.

Military offices
Preceded by Anton von Thurn-Valle-Sassina	Inhaber of Infantry Regiment Nr. 43; 1806–1809	Succeeded by disbanded
Preceded by Joseph Philipp Vukassovich	Inhaber of Infantry Regiment Nr. 48; 1809–1810	Succeeded by Paul von Radivojevich
Preceded by Geneyne	feldzeugmeister of Slavonian Military Frontier; June 1807–October 1810	Succeeded by ?
