= Chauconin-Neufmontiers =

- Commune
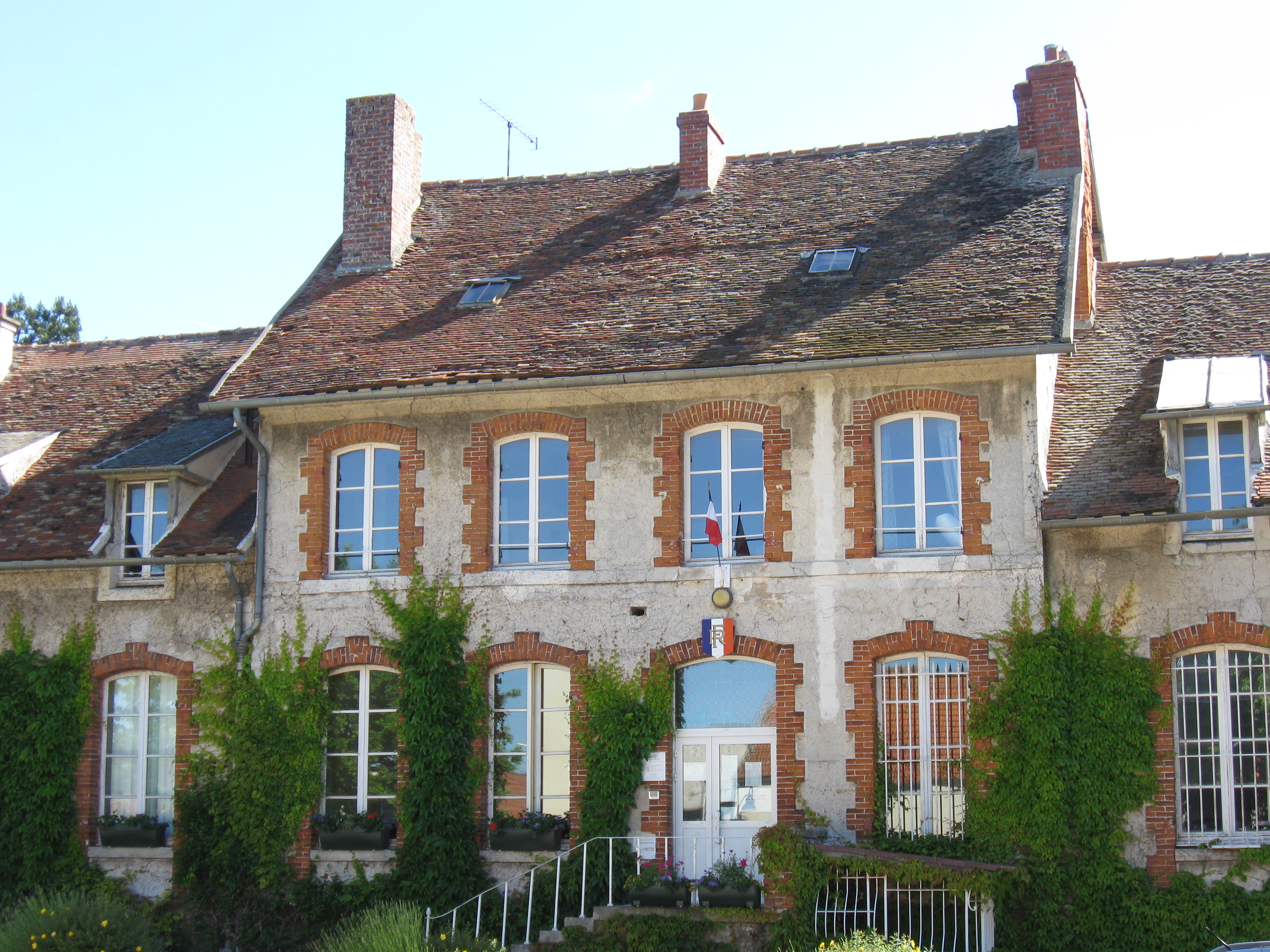
- The town hall in Chauconin-Neufmontiers
- Location of Chauconin-Neufmontiers
- Location within France Location within Île-de-France (region)
- Coordinates: 48°58′27″N 2°50′19″E
- Country: France
- Region: Île-de-France
- Department: Seine-et-Marne
- Arrondissement: Meaux
- Canton: Claye-Souilly
- Intercommunality: CA Pays de Meaux

Government
  - Mayor (2023–2026): Marie Leal
- Area^{1}: 17.39 km^{2} (6.71 sq mi)
- Highest elevation: 162 m (531 ft)
- Lowest elevation: 58 m (190 ft)
- Population (2023): 3,784
  - Density: 217.6/km^{2} (563.6/sq mi)
- Time zone: UTC+01:00 (CET)
  - Summer (DST): UTC+02:00 (CEST)
- INSEE/Postal code: 77335 /77124
- ^{1} French Land Register data, which excludes lakes, ponds, glaciers > 1 km^{2} (0.386 sq mi or 247 acres) and river estuaries.

Chauconin-Neufmontiers (French pronunciation: [ʃokɔnɛ̃ nœfmɔ̃tje]) is a commune in the Seine-et-Marne department in the Île-de-France region in north-central France.

== Population ==
Historical population
| Year | Pop. | ±% p.a. |
|---|---|---|
| 1968 | 573 | — |
| 1975 | 658 | +2.00% |
| 1982 | 824 | +3.27% |
| 1990 | 1,489 | +7.68% |
| 1999 | 1,494 | +0.04% |
| 2007 | 2,560 | +6.96% |
| 2012 | 2,833 | +2.05% |
| 2017 | 3,289 | +3.03% |
| 2023 | 3,784 | +2.36% |
Source: INSEE

The inhabitants are called Coconatiens Neufmontois in French.

== See also ==
- Communes of the Seine-et-Marne department
