= Siege of Dubica =

1788 battle during the Austro-Turkish War

Siege of Dubica (1788)
- Part of Austro-Turkish War (1788–1791)
Date	19–26 April 1788
Location	Dubica, Bosnia and Herzegovina
Result	Ottoman victory

Belligerents
Habsburg monarchy: Kingdom of Croatia	Ottoman Empire: Eyalet of Bosnia

Commanders and leaders
(Habsburg monarchy) Prince Liechtenstein (Habsburg monarchy) Anton Belasi (DOW) (Habsburg monarchy) Leopold Unterberger	Unknown

Strength
10,000	Thousands

Casualties and losses
Heavy	Unknown

In the siege of Dubica, a Habsburg Austrian army led by Prince Liechtenstein besieged an Ottoman Turkish garrison in the fortress of Dubica in April 1788. The siege ended in failure.

== Background ==
After the Austrian declaration of war on the Ottomans on February 9, 1788, the Imperials expected great success on the Bosnian front, during which hostilities began. The Imperials expected no resistance and promised the Christian inhabitants a liberation from Ottoman rule. However, the Imperials suffered setbacks. On the same day of the declaration of war, the Imperials, led by Colonel Knesevich, attacked Dubica but were repelled. A bombardment on Novi Sad from February 10 to March 21 ended in failure as well. Soon, things returned to peace for two months, until they were interrupted by raids.

== Siege ==
The Imperial Army of the Croatian Corps began operations in April. The Imperials were led by Prince Liechtenstein and had an army of 10,000 men. On the nights of 19 to 20, they crossed the Una River into two columns and arrived in Dubica. On April 22, the Imperials began bombarding the fort using mortar batteries, and they made a breach in the walls. The assault, however, was repulsed by the garrison.

On April 25, the Imperials launched an assault on Dubica. And with two cannons attempted to take up a position fifty paces in front of the breach. However, after only a few rounds of canister shots, the entire gun crew had been cut down by the Bosnian sharpshooters. After a battle of six hours, the Ottomans managed to repel the assault, but at the same time, an Ottoman army of 8,000 men appeared behind the besiegers and attacked them. The Imperials managed to repel them but lost 550 men during the combat. Major general Count Anton of the Khuen von Belasi family died of his wounds soon after the battle. Two other Habsburg generals and 18 officers were killed in action.

The Imperials neglected to surround the fortress. A Sipahi detachment was sent to destroy an Austrian bridge. Learning of this, the Imperials dispatched Graeven hussars to prevent them; however, the Ottomans defeated the hussars and forced them to retreat. After a report of the approach of a 10,000-strong Ottoman army was received, on April 26, Prince Liechtenstein abandoned the siege and retreated behind the Una River again. One author about the engagement of Dubica cited "The walls of Dubitza were so strong that sometimes even some cannonballs bounced back from them."

== Aftermath ==
After the defeat at Dubica, the Imperial army made no further movements on the Bosnian front. Prince Liechtenstein was removed from his post in August and gave it to Ernst Gideon von Laudon.

== Sources ==
- Matthew Z Mayer, Joseph II and the campaign of 1788 against the Ottoman Turks.
- Oscar Criste, Wars under Emperor Josef II. Edited according to field files and other authentic sources in the military history department.
- József Bánlaky: Military history of the Hungarian nation (MEK-OSZK), 0014/1149. The campaign of 1788.
- Gunther Erich Rothenberg, The Military Border in Croatia, 1740–1881; a study of an imperial institution.
