= Jean Thomas Guillaume Lorge =

- Born: 22 November 1767; Caen, France
- Died: 28 November 1826 (aged 59); Chauconin-Neufmontiers, France
- Military career
- Allegiance: (France) French First Republic, (France) First French Empire
- Branch: Cavalry
- Service years: 1785–1825
- Rank: General of Division
- Conflicts: French Revolutionary Wars, Napoleonic Wars
- Awards: Légion d'honneur (Grand Officer); Order of Saint Louis (Knight)
- Other work: Commissary for the return of French prisoners in the kingdoms of Portugal and Spain

Jean Thomas Guillaume Lorge (French pronunciation: [ʒɑ̃ tɔmɑ ɡijom lɔʁʒ]; born 22 November 1767 in Caen; died 28 November 1826 in Chauconin-Neufmontiers), was a French cavalry commander during the French Revolutionary and Napoleonic Wars. Lorge is one of the names inscribed under the Arc de Triomphe, on Column 6.
