= Jean Bontemps =

French privateer (died 1572)

- Born: France
- Died: 1572; 454 years ago Curaçao
- Piratical career
- Type: Privateer
- Allegiance: France
- Years active: 1559–1572
- Rank: Captain
- Base of operations: Caribbean Sea

Jean Bontemps (died 1572) was a French privateer. In 1559, sailing with Jean-Martin Cotes, he attacked the towns of Santa Marta and Cartagena de Indias, in modern-day Colombia. Bontemps and his men ransacked both towns and extorted a 4,000-peso ransom from Cartagena.

In 1567, Bontemps cooperated with John Lovell's semi-piratical trading expedition to Margarita, in modern Venezuela. A show of force provided the local Spanish, who desperately needed supplies, with the necessary pretext to violate the royal prohibition on trading with foreign powers. Bontemps then attacked Rio de la Hacha without success, and does not appear to have taken part in Lovell's voyage there a few days later.

Bontemps attempted a raid on Curaçao in 1572, and was killed by a Spanish arrow or crossbow bolt through the throat. The Spanish took his head to Santo Domingo as a prize.
