= Ruffey-sur-Seille =

Commune in Bourgogne-Franche-Comté, France

- Commune
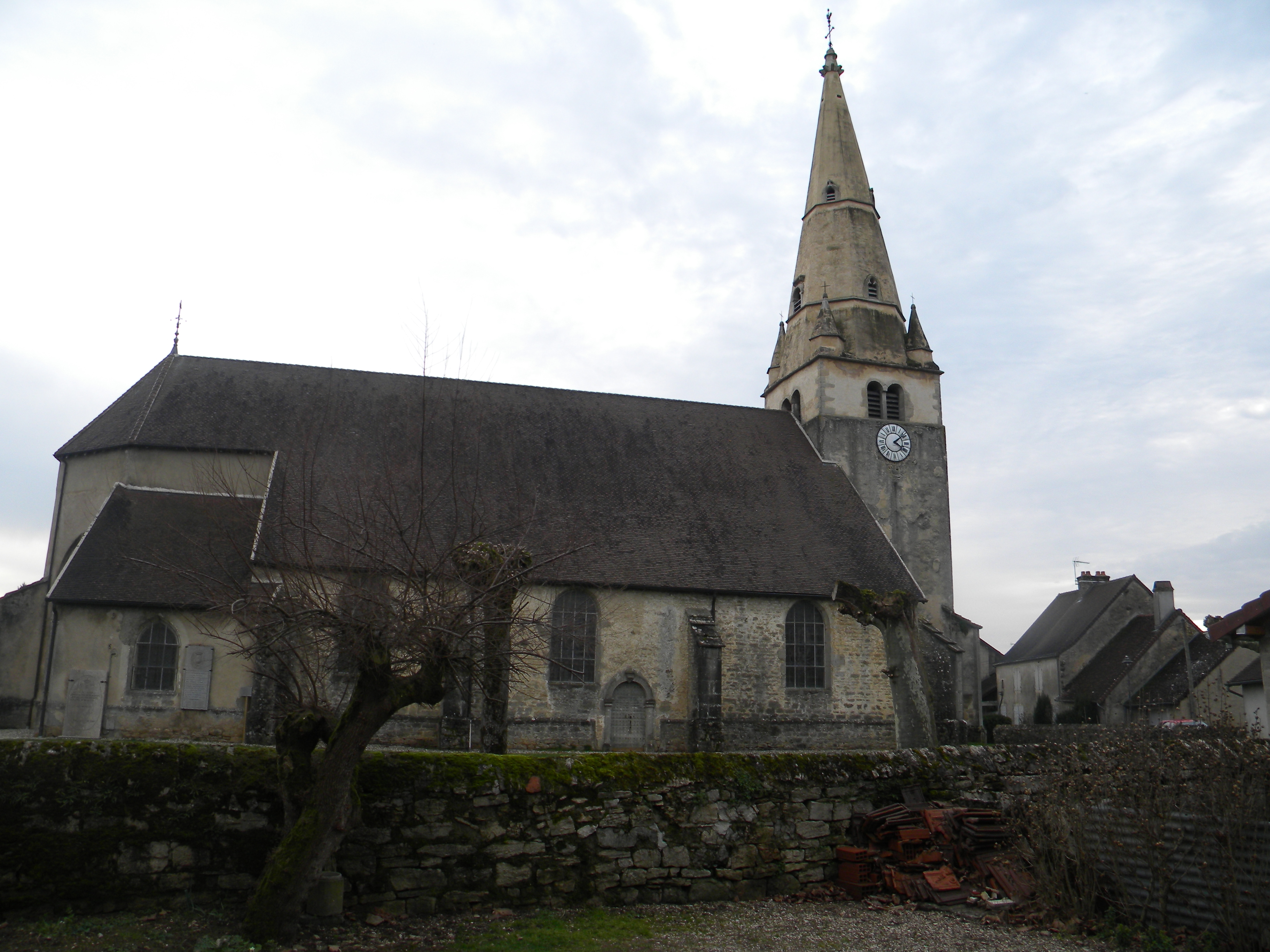
- The church in Ruffey-sur-Seille
- Location of Ruffey-sur-Seille
- Location within France Location within Bourgogne-Franche-Comté
- Coordinates: 46°44′42″N 5°29′46″E
- Country: France
- Region: Bourgogne-Franche-Comté
- Department: Jura
- Arrondissement: Lons-le-Saunier
- Canton: Bletterans

Government
  - Mayor (2020–2026): Emmanuel Billet
- Area^{1}: 18.01 km^{2} (6.95 sq mi)
- Highest elevation: 304 m (997 ft)
- Lowest elevation: 201 m (659 ft)
- Population (2023): 738
  - Density: 41.0/km^{2} (106/sq mi)
- Time zone: UTC+01:00 (CET)
  - Summer (DST): UTC+02:00 (CEST)
- INSEE/Postal code: 39471 /39140
- ^{1} French Land Register data, which excludes lakes, ponds, glaciers > 1 km^{2} (0.386 sq mi or 247 acres) and river estuaries.

Ruffey-sur-Seille (French pronunciation: [ʁyfɛ syʁ sɛj], literally Ruffey on Seille) is a commune in the Jura department in the region of Bourgogne-Franche-Comté located in eastern France.

== Population ==
Historical population
Year	Pop.	±% p.a.
1968	520	—
1975	507	−0.36%
1982	558	+1.38%
1990	602	+0.95%
1999	736	+2.26%
2007	766	+0.50%
2012	735	−0.82%
2017	734	−0.03%
2023	738	+0.09%
Source: INSEE

== See also ==
- Communes of the Jura department
