= Hotze =

Hotze is a surname. Notable people with the surname include:

- Friedrich Freiherr von Hotze (1739–1799), Swiss-born field marshal in the Austrian army
- Henry Hotze (1833–1887), Swiss-born propagandist for the Confederate States of America during the American Civil War
- Steven Hotze (born 1950), American conservative talk-radio host
