= Jean-François Dumonceau =

Dutch general (1790–1884)

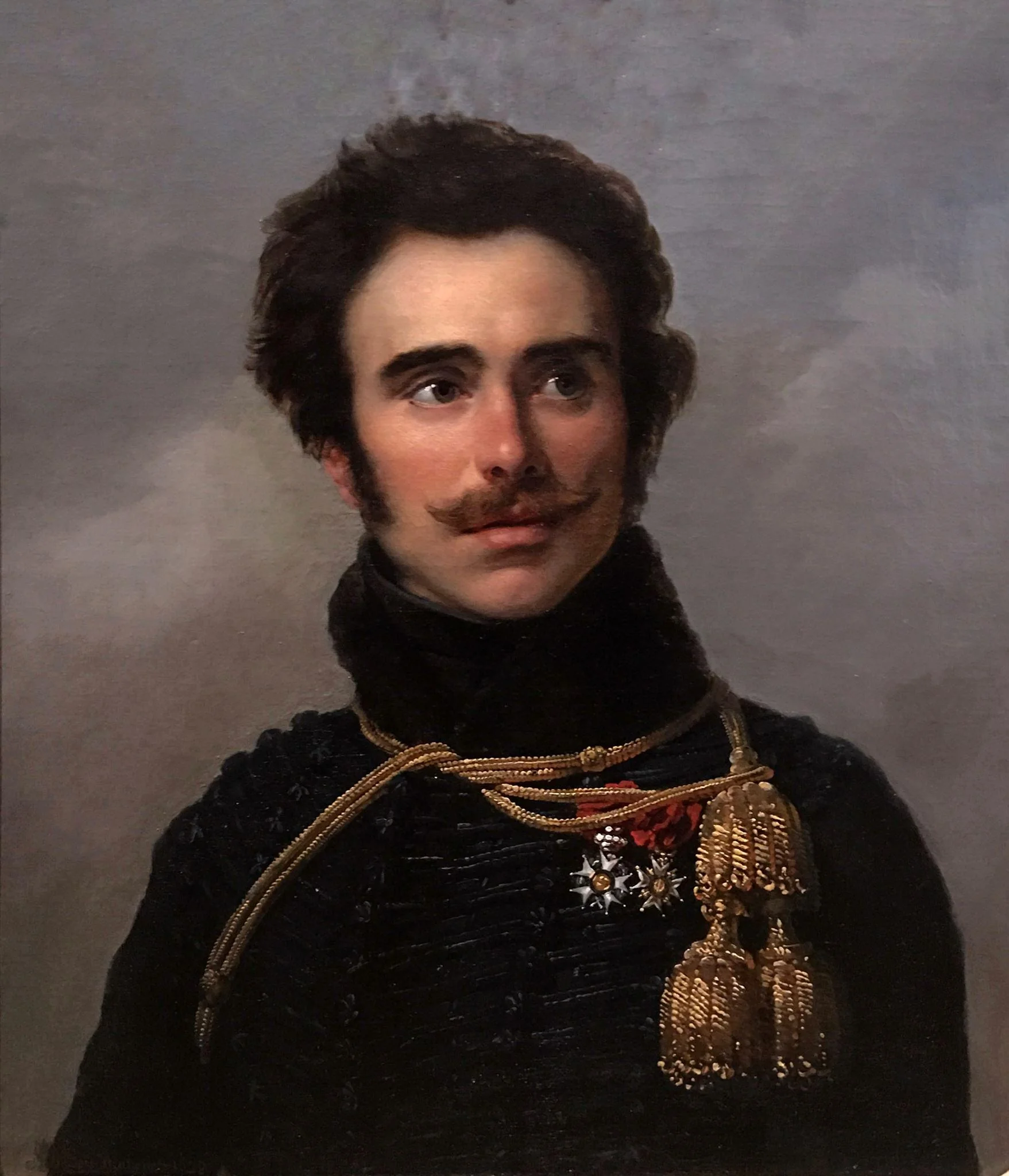
- Portrait of Dumonceau as Major of the Dutch 6th Regiment of Hussars in 1822, by Alexandre-Jean Dubois-Drahonet.
- Born: 1 March 1790; Brussels, Austrian Netherlands (modern Belgium)
- Died: 1 March 1884 (aged 94); The Hague, The Netherlands
- Military career
- Allegiance: Batavian Republic; Kingdom of Holland; First French Empire; United Kingdom of the Netherlands
- Conflicts: War of the Second Coalition; War of the Third Coalition; War of the Fourth Coalition; Siege of Hamelin; War of the Fifth Coalition; French invasion of Russia; Battle of Smolensk; Battle of Borodino; French occupation of Moscow; Battle of Berezina; War of the Sixth Coalition; Action at Remagen; First Battle of Bar-sur-Aube; Hundred Days; Belgian Revolution; Ten days' campaign

Jean François, Count Dumonceau (1 March 1790 in Brussels – 1 March 1884 in The Hague) was a Dutch lieutenant general who served in the Batavian, French, and Dutch armies. Over the course of a long military career spanning the Napoleonic Wars and the early decades of the Kingdom of the Netherlands, he rose to become inspector of the cavalry and chief of the king's Military Household.

The memoires he wrote, which give a detailed account of Napoleon's invasion of Russia in 1812, are an important source for modern historians.

== Early life and Batavian service ==
Dumonceau was born in Brussels on 1 March 1790, the son of Jean-Baptiste Dumonceau and Anna Maria Apolonia Colinet. He entered military service at an early age. On 19 October 1799 he enlisted as a volunteer gunner in the Batavian army with the 4th Battalion of Artillery at Groningen. On 25 June 1805, at the age of fifteen, he was appointed second lieutenant in the Batavian Dragoons. In this capacity he served on the staff of his father, who commanded the Batavian division during the campaign in Germany and Austria that year.

In 1806 he joined a detachment of the Guard Hussars attached to the northern army under Louis Bonaparte. This force initially took up positions near Wesel in order to tie down elements of the Prussian army and obscure Napoleon's intentions. After the Battle of Jena–Auerstedt the army occupied Münster, Hesse-Kassel, Osnabrück, and Hanover. On 6 November 1806 Dumonceau first distinguished himself in combat during a charge against part of the garrison of Hameln.

On 30 March 1809 he was formally recognised as a Dutch national together with his father.

== Service in the French army ==
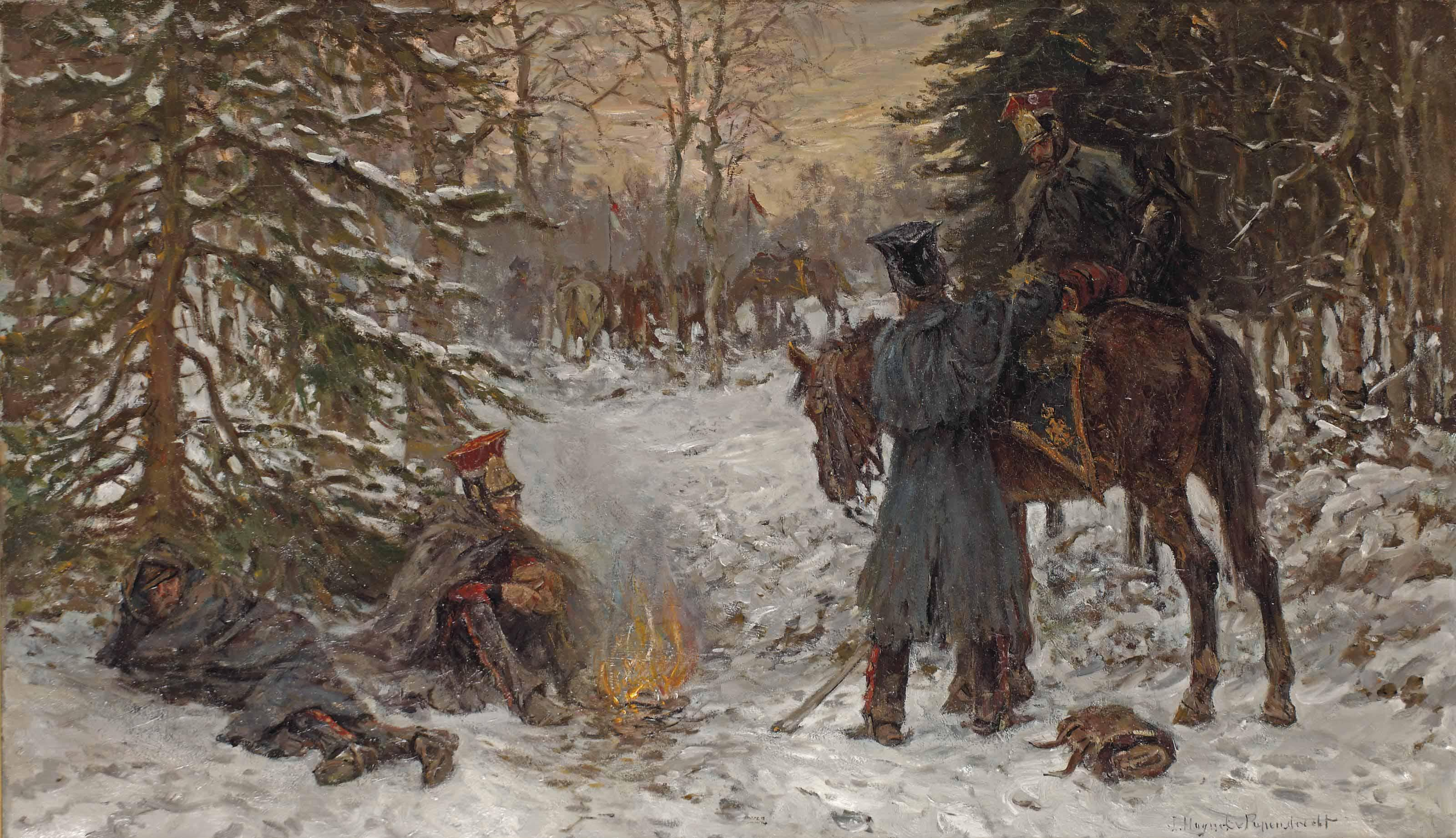
The Red Lancers in Russia. By Jan Hoynck van Papendrecht.

After the annexation of the Kingdom of Holland by the French Empire in 1810, the Dutch Guard Hussars were incorporated into the French Imperial Guard as the 2nd Regiment of Guard Lancers (Red Lancers). Dumonceau served with this unit and, by the time of the campaign, held the rank of captain. He took part in the French invasion of Russia, during which the regiment was largely destroyed.

Following this campaign he was appointed chef d'escadron in the 5th Regiment of Chasseurs à Cheval, which at that time served in Spain. In the first half of 1813 he led two squadrons composed largely of recruits and veterans on a sixty-six-day march from Spain to Germany. Under his leadership the troops arrived in good order and in serviceable condition at Leipzig on 10 July 1813.

During the campaign of 1814 he again distinguished himself. On 2 January at Remagen he recaptured a cannon at the head of fifty cavalrymen, and on 23 February at Troyes he was among the first to charge an enemy battery. For his bravery he was awarded the cross of the Legion of Honour on 18 March 1814 on the battlefield near Léchelle, east of Provins.

After Napoleon's first abdication he remained in French service until 9 November 1815, when he resigned with honourable discharge.

== Service in the Dutch army ==
After returning to the Netherlands Dumonceau entered active service in the Dutch army on 19 February 1819. He was appointed major in the 6th Hussars, one rank lower than the lieutenant colonelcy he had held in French service.

Despite this initial reduction in rank he later rose to the highest positions in the Dutch cavalry. On 10 August 1827 he was appointed adjutant to the Prince of Orange. On 1 September 1830 he accompanied the prince when the latter entered the revolutionary city of Brussels with only a small group of staff officers during the outbreak of the Belgian Revolution. Later that autumn he also accompanied the prince to London.

On 25 March 1831 he was honourably discharged from his position as adjutant and appointed lieutenant colonel and commander of the 5th Regiment of Light Dragoons, a unit that had been severely weakened by the desertion of Belgian soldiers and had to be largely rebuilt from recruits and detachments from other regiments.

The regiment and Dumonceau distinguished themselves during the Ten Days' Campaign. As a result Dumonceau was appointed Knight Fourth Class of the Military William Order on 31 August 1831 and later promoted to the Third Class of the order on 28 November 1840.

He continued to rise through the ranks and was eventually promoted to lieutenant general and inspector of the cavalry on 8 September 1852.

== Later life ==
On 29 May 1854 Dumonceau was appointed Chief of the King's Military Household and president of the court commission. Later that year, on 9 September 1854, he retired from active service.

He had married Thérèse Anne Ghislaine d'Aubremé in Brussels on 13 January 1819. The couple had five children, three daughters and two sons.

Jean François, Count Dumonceau, died on 1 March 1884 in The Hague. Contemporary accounts described him as having left behind an unblemished reputation both as a man and as an officer.

== Memoirs ==
Dumonceau left extensive memoirs based on journals and correspondence he kept throughout his military career. His notes originated during the campaign of 1805, when he was tasked with keeping a journal of the marches and operations of a Batavian division. From that time onward he continued to record his experiences. Beginning in 1829 he started to compile these notes into a full set of memoirs, a project he completed around 1855.

The memoirs consist of fourteen large manuscript volumes covering the period from 1790 to 1850 and are preserved in the Nationaal Archief in The Hague. Part of these writings concerns his experiences as a cavalry officer during the French invasion of Russia, which he experienced as a captain in the Dutch Red Lancers of the Imperial Guard, one of the few Dutch units that marched with Napoleon to Moscow and back.

Historians have considered Dumonceau’s memoirs to be among the most detailed surviving Dutch accounts of the campaign. The Belgian historian Jean Puraye described them as unusually precise and conscientious, noting that they correspond closely with contemporary official documents. Dumonceau’s writings have also been cited extensively in studies of the campaign, including Paul Britten Austin’s 1812: Napoleon’s Invasion of Russia, where he is characterised as an unusually observant witness.

The original daily notes on which the memoirs were based have not survived.

== Sources ==
- Blok, P.J.; Molhuysen, P.C. (1912). "Du Monceau, Jean François graaf". Nieuw Nederlandsch biografisch woordenboek. Deel 2.
- Oosterbeek, Willem (2014). Naar Moskou! Naar Moskou!. Athenaeum - Polak & Van Gennep.
