= Karl Ludwig von Lecoq =

German general

- Born: 23 September 1754; Eilenburg, Electorate of Saxony
- Died: 14 February 1829 (aged 74) Berlin, Kingdom of Prussia
- Allegiance: Saxony; Kingdom of Prussia
- Branch: Infantry
- Service years: Saxony 1770-1787 (Kingdom of Prussia) Prussia 1787-1809
- Rank: General Officer
- Conflicts: French Revolutionary Wars; Napoleonic Wars
- Awards: Pour le Mérite (military order)
- Other work: Chief, Grenadier Garde Infantry Regiment # 6

Karl Ludwig von Lecoq or Karl Ludwig von Le Coq, born 23 September 1754 – died 14 February 1829, of French Huguenot ancestry, first joined the army of the Electorate of Saxony. He later transferred his loyalty to the Kingdom of Prussia and fought during the French Revolutionary Wars, earning a coveted award for bravery. While serving variously as a staff officer and diplomat, he became renowned as an expert cartographer. In 1806 he was entrusted with command of the forces in northwest Germany. Cut off from the main body of the Prussian army after the disaster at the Battle of Jena-Auerstedt, he concentrated his troops in the fortress of Hameln. After a brief siege, he surrendered his troops to an inferior force of enemies. For this, he was sentenced to life imprisonment. However, he was later pardoned and continued his map-making until he went blind.

== Early career ==
Lecoq was born on 23 September 1754 to a French Huguenot family in Eilenburg in the Electorate of Saxony. His father Johann Ludwig Lecoq (1719–1789) was a lieutenant general in the Saxon army. (Karl Ludwig's younger brother Karl Christian Erdmann von Lecoq (1767–1830) also rose to become a lieutenant general in the Saxon army).

Joining the Riedesel Infantry Regiment Nr. 10 as a junior Leutnant in 1770, Lecoq rose to the rank of captain by 1779. He transferred to the Prussian army in 1787. Promoted to major, he was appointed to lead the Legat Fusilier battalion Nr. 20, based in Magdeburg. In 1792 he joined the staff of Feldmarschall Charles William Ferdinand, Duke of Brunswick and fought in the War of the First Coalition at the Battle of Valmy and other actions. For his courageous actions during the Siege of Mainz from 14 April to 23 July 1793, Lecoq was awarded the Pour le Mérite.

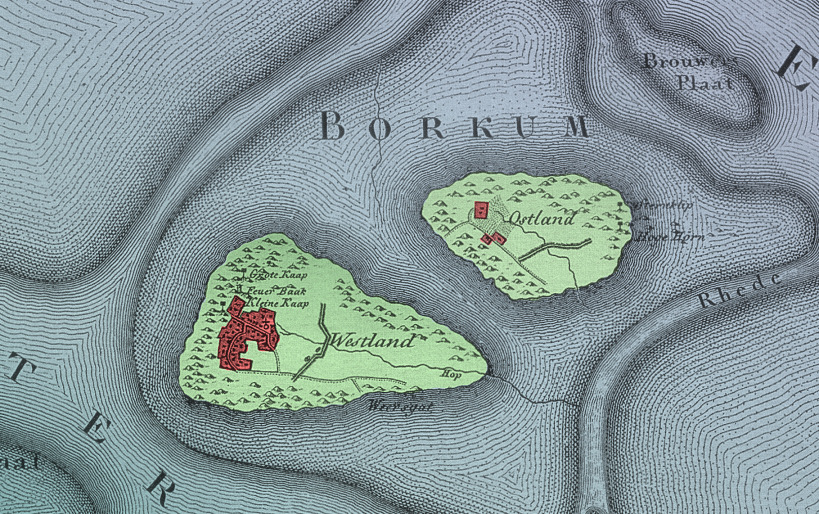
Lecoq's maps of the isle of Borkum

Map of North Eastern Westphalia by Lecoq, (1805)

After the Peace of Basel in 1795, Brunswick's army guarded the Prussian frontier in northwest Germany. Lecoq was promoted to Oberstleutnant and appointed Brunswick's Quartermaster General, the equivalent of Chief of Staff. While performing his military duties, he began mapping Westphalia. He was an observer of the French Army of Sambre-et-Meuse during the Rhine Campaign of 1796. On 15 August 1796 he reported to King Frederick William II from Plauen on how Jourdan managed his army. Lecoq noted approvingly that 6–9 pm every evening was devoted to writing up the next day's orders for each division commander, after which orderlies delivered the instructions. He mentioned that the French army had very little equipment and was badly dressed, but that its foot and horse soldiers were robust and its artillery was drawn by good horses. Having won the confidence of Frederick William II and his successor King Frederick William III, Lecoq was sent in 1801 on a diplomatic mission to Saint Petersburg in the Russian Empire. In 1802, he negotiated the transfer of Gerhard von Scharnhorst from the Electorate of Hanover to Prussian service.

While performing his military duties, he began mapping Westphalia. Inspired by the French cartographer Dominique, comte de Cassini, Lecoq completed his Große Karte von Westfalen (Great Map of Westphalia) between 1795 and 1805. In this time he was in correspondence with Carl Friedrich Gauss, who helped him in determining the longitude of certain places. Already celebrated as a talented map-maker in his own right, the king named him commander-in-chief of the Grenadier Garde Infantry Regiment Nr. 6 in 1801. He was also appointed to a board to examine general staff officer candidates. In 1803, he received promotion to General-major and the following year founded the Junker School.

== 1806 ==
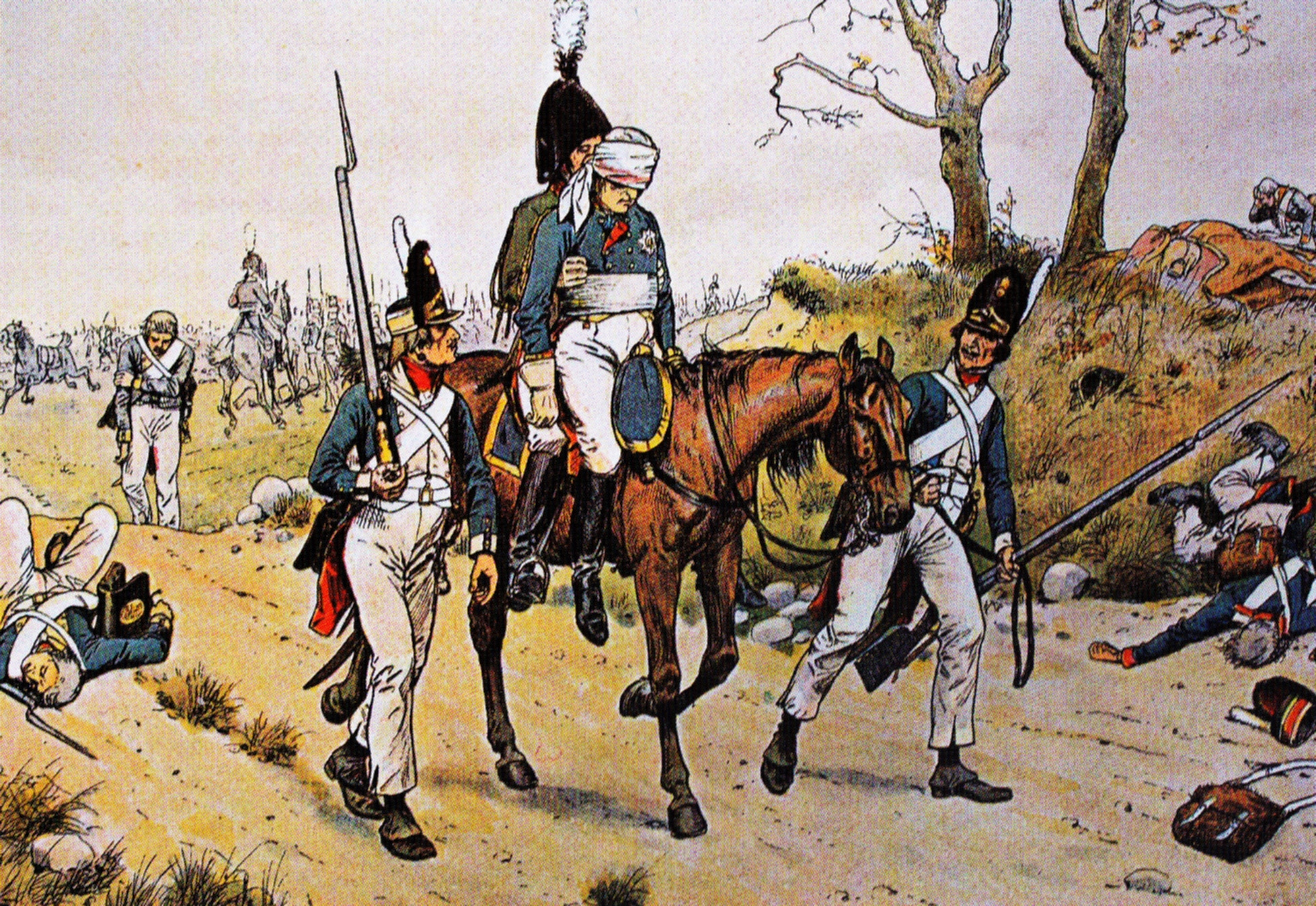
The Battle of Jena-Auerstedt by Richard Knötel.

Before the War of the Fourth Coalition, large Prussian forces were assembled in northwest Germany. Gebhard von Blücher commanded 16 battalions and 17 squadrons in Westphalia, while 20 battalions and 28 squadrons deployed in the former Electorate of Hanover. Around the beginning of October 1806, the bulk of these forces moved south under the orders of Lieutenant General Blücher and General of Infantry Ernst von Rüchel to take position near Eisenach and Gotha. At the time, Blücher left General-Major von Hagken and General-Major von Brusewitz near Münster to defend Westphalia against a French incursion. Before the war started, Lecoq received command of all forces in the area. Together with the garrisons of Hameln and Nienburg, about 12,000 Prussians defended Hanover and Westphalia.

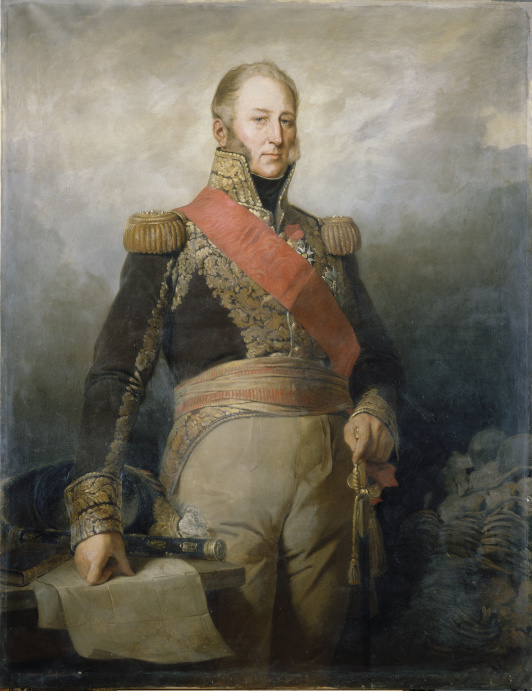
Marshal Mortier by Edouard Dubufe

Opposing them were King Louis Bonaparte, leading the army of the Kingdom of Holland, and Marshal Édouard Adolphe Casimir Joseph Mortier at the fortress of Mainz. Louis placed a strong garrison in the fortress of Wesel with a body of about 6,000 troops hovering to the northeast. Another similar-sized unit was stationed at Utrecht. Mortier's formation was named the VIII Corps and included one division under General of Division Louis Henri Loison. Emperor Napoleon I of France intended for the forces of Louis and Mortier to observe the Prussians until he defeated their main army. Then they would overrun northwest Germany.

On 9 October, columns under Lecoq and Hagken began marching west, though progress was slow. Ten days later, news of the catastrophic Battle of Jena-Auerstedt reached Lecoq and he immediately ordered a retreat. When he heard that the broken armies were retreating through the Harz Mountains, he directed his march toward the fortress of Hameln. His and Hagken's columns reached there on 23 October and went into camp. He issued orders to gather food into the city for a siege. The next day, he set out again to the east, hoping to get across the Elbe River and escape the onrushing French. Hearing a report that he was cut off from the Elbe, he gave up on the 27th and marched back to Hameln. However, he detached one infantry battalion and a dragoon regiment under Oberst von Osten in an attempt to get through to Blücher.

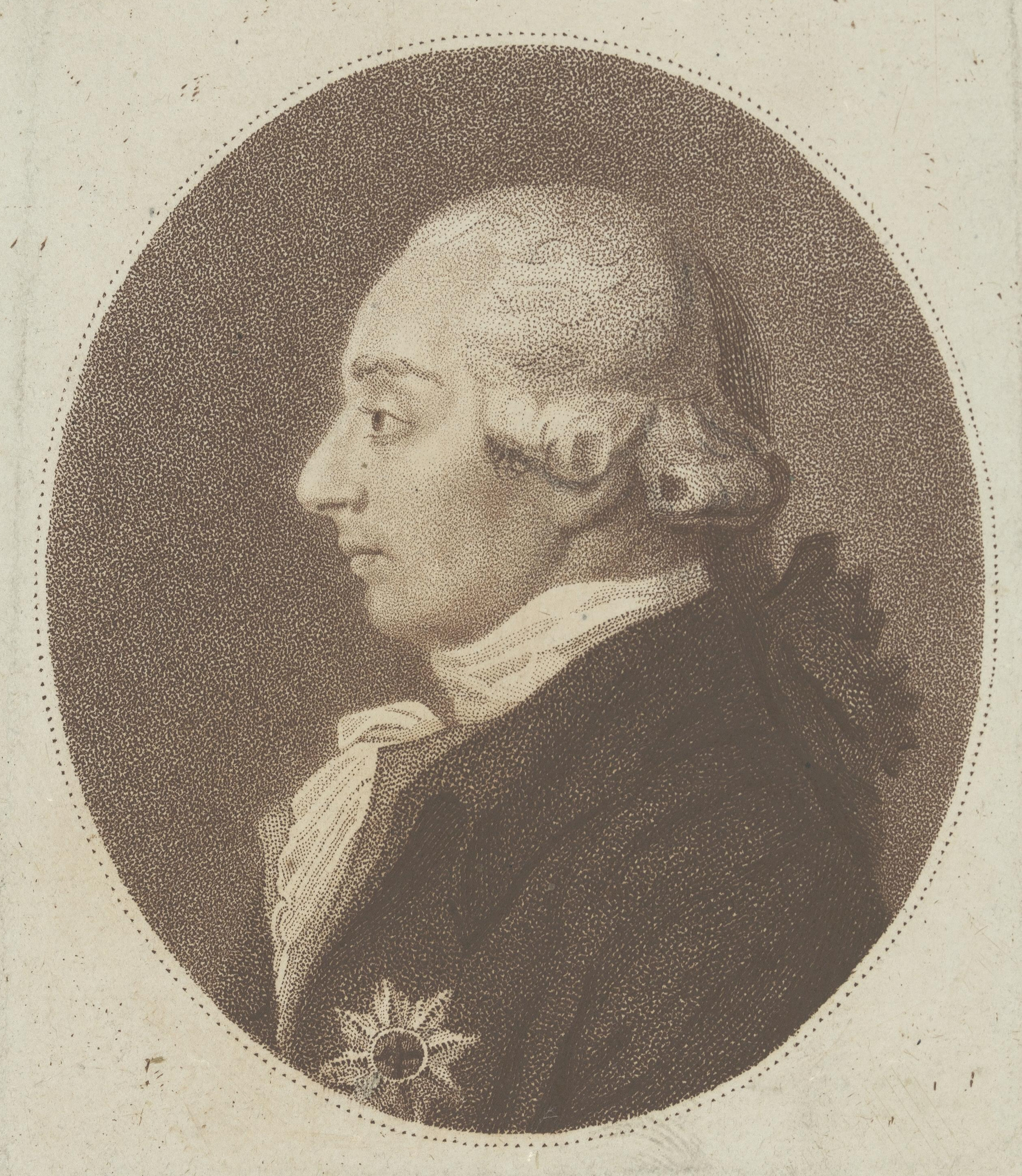
Lucchesini

Meanwhile, Napoleon gave Louis and Mortier the signal to advance. First, he directed their columns on the neutral state of Hesse-Kassel. Napoleon knew that William I, Elector of Hesse, though officially neutral, was pro-Prussian and he determined to depose him. Mortier's 5,500 men and Louis' troops overran Hesse-Kassel, disarmed the Hessian army, and chased the elector into exile. On 9 November, Louis withdrew from the campaign in bad health, leaving Mortier in command of a 12,000-man corps. Starting on 7 October, French troops moved into the area of Hameln. By the 10th, a good part of Mortier's corps appeared before the city.

By this time, Lecoq had the fortifications in good repair and manned them with about 10,000 troops. The city and fortress were well stocked with food and supplies and ready to sustain a siege. Mortier left 6,000 men to maintain the Siege of Hameln and continued his march on Hanover, which he occupied on 12 October. Jean Baptiste Dumonceau commanded the Hameln blockading force which was organized into one cavalry and three infantry brigades with 12 artillery pieces. Mortier did his best to browbeat Lecoq into surrendering, but his initial attempts were unsuccessful.

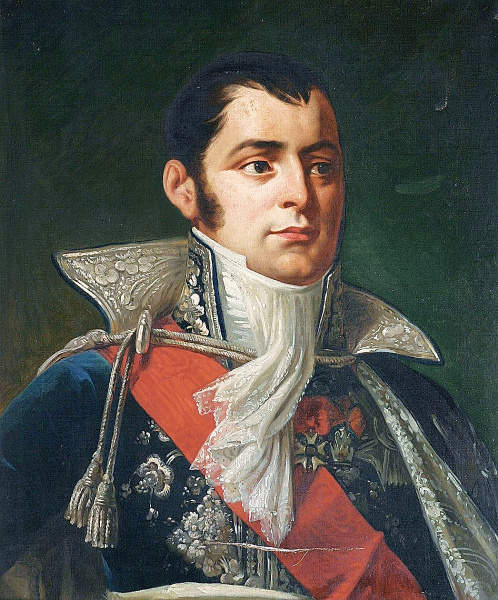
Anne Jean René Savary

Lecoq's 10,000 troops and 175 guns included a 3,058-strong garrison under the 75-year-old General-Major von Schöler. These troops comprised the 3rd battalions of the Schenck Infantry Regiment Nr. 9, Tschammer Infantry Regiment Nr. 27, Hagken Infantry Regiment Nr. 44 and Hessen Infantry Regiment Nr. 48. Two battalions of the Oranien Infantry Regiment Nr. 19 rounded out the garrison. The remainder of Lecoq's force consisted of four Invalid companies from the first four regiments, 40 hussars, 181 artillerists, 1,000 fugitives from Jena-Auerstedt and recruit drafts from the Treuenfels Infantry Regiment Nr. 29 and the Strachwitz Infantry Regiment Nr. 43.

While these operations were in progress, Napoleon signed an armistice with the king's envoy Girolamo Lucchesini that specified that the remaining Prussian fortresses were to be surrendered. King Frederick William III later refused to sign the document, but that did not stop the French emperor from trying to exploit the tentative agreement. He sent Anne Jean Marie René Savary to Hameln with the information in an attempt to coax the garrison into laying down its arms. On 19 November, Savary arrived at Hameln and was granted a parley with Lecoq and his generals. Putting his diplomatic talent to good use, he reminded the generals that there was no Prussian field army within 400 kilometers. After he revealed the conditions of the armistice, Lecoq decided to capitulate. The surrender terms were similar to those at the Capitulation of Prenzlau in that officers were to be paroled and the enlisted men were to be made prisoners.

When Lecoq's rank and file found out about the capitulation, a mutiny broke out and the soldiers forced their way into wine-shops and soon became drunk. Robbery, looting and other disorders followed. For their part, the officers demanded that they be paid and that their troops be paroled. There are two versions of what happened next. In one account, Savary turned his cavalry loose in the streets to drive the Prussians out of the city. Once outside the city they were surrounded and disarmed. In the second account, 9,000 soldiers dispersed into the countryside in the confusion and only 600 were marched into captivity after the 22 November capitulation. On 26 November, the fortress of Nienburg capitulated with its 2,911-man garrison.

Historian Digby Smith called the surrender "shameful". Francis Loraine Petre believed that Lecoq's situation was hopeless, but that it was his responsibility to hold out as long as possible. A long siege might have kept a substantial French force from being used in the winter campaign.

== Later career ==
In 1809, Lecoq faced an inquiry into the surrender of the fortress. Sentenced to life in prison, he was sent to Spandau. However, he was allowed to live mostly in the city rather than in a prison cell. In 1812, the king refused his request for clemency, though he was permitted to visit his estate in Pichelsdorf near Berlin. After Prussia joined the War of the Sixth Coalition in 1813, he was allowed to live in Oranienburg. In 1814 he was finally pardoned and took up residence in Berlin where he continued work on his beloved maps as his eyesight faded away. Lecoq's wife Marie Charlotte Lautier (b. 1760) died in 1826. The couple had four children, of whom two daughters survived until adulthood. Completely blind, Lecoq died in Berlin on 14 February 1829 and was buried in the French cemetery.
