= VIII Corps (Grande Armée) =

- Active: 1805–1807; 1812–1814
- Country: First French Empire
- Branch: French Imperial Army
- Size: Corps
- Engagements: War of the Third Coalition; War of the Fourth Coalition; Russian campaign War of the Sixth Coalition

Commanders
- Notable commanders: Jean-Andoche Junot; André Masséna; Édouard Mortier; Józef Poniatowski; Dominique Vandamme

The VIII Corps of the Grande Armée was a French military unit that existed during the Napoleonic Wars. Emperor Napoleon I formed it in 1805 by borrowing divisions from other corps and assigned it to Marshal Édouard Mortier. Marshal André Masséna's Army of Italy was also reorganized as the VIII Corps at the end of the 1805 campaign. The corps was reformed for the 1806 campaign under Mortier and spent the rest of the year mopping up Prussian garrisons in western Germany.

A new VIII Corps was formed from Westphalians for the French invasion of Russia in 1812 and placed under Junot's command once more. The corps was effectively destroyed during the retreat. The following year, the corps was rebuilt with Polish units and assigned to Józef Poniatowski. The VIII Corps fought in the 1813 German campaign and ceased to exist after the Battle of Leipzig.

== History ==
=== 1805 ===
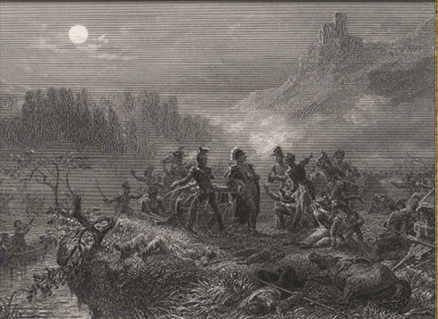
The Battle of Dürenstein

The corps was first called into existence during the War of the Third Coalition in 1805. After destroying much of the Austrian Empire's military strength in the Ulm campaign, Napoleon ordered his generals to advance toward the Austrian capital of Vienna. The emperor formed a new VIII Corps under Mortier and assigned four divisions to the new organization. Mortier's task was to operate on the north bank of the Danube and protect the French army's strategic left flank. The divisions were led by Generals Jean-Baptiste Dumonceau, Honoré Théodore Maxime Gazan de la Peyrière, Pierre Dupont de l'Etang, and Louis Klein. Dumonceau's division transferred from the II Corps, Gazan's from the V Corps, Dupont's from the VI Corps, and Klein's from the I Cavalry Corps. On 11 November 1805, Mortier with the 5,000 men of Gazan's division bumped into a greatly superior force of Russians and Austrians. In the Battle of Dürenstein, Gazan suffered 3,000 casualties but was saved from annihilation when Dupont's division arrived later in the day. Neither Klein nor Dumonceau were engaged in the action. The VIII Corps missed the Battle of Austerlitz.

Even after his decisive triumph at Austerlitz, Napoleon believed Archduke Charles' large army to be a threat. Therefore, he ordered Masséna to reorganize his Army of Italy as the VIII Corps. Masséna was to march east with his main body while sending his heavy cavalry to Graz. General Auguste de Marmont assembled at Graz with the II Corps while Marshal Michel Ney arrived at Klagenfurt with the VI Corps. The emperor placed Marshal Louis-Nicolas Davout's III Corps at Bratislava (Pressburg) and Marshal Jean-de-Dieu Soult's IV Corps south of Vienna. In this way, Charles' army was totally contained. On 26 December, the Treaty of Pressburg was signed, ending the war.

=== 1806–1807 ===
During the War of the Fourth Coalition, the VIII Corps was re-established at Mainz under Mortier. Together with troops from the Kingdom of Holland under King Louis Bonaparte, the corps defended against a westward thrust by Prussian forces in the former Electorate of Hanover. On 17 October 1806, Napoleon ordered Mortier to seize Fulda while Louis was to capture Paderborn and Münster. From these locations they would converge on Kassel whose ruler, William I, Elector of Hesse the emperor wished to depose. On 1 November, Mortier entered Kassel from the south with General Loison's 5,500-man division composed of three French light infantry regiments. Louis arrived from the north with Dutch soldiers a few hours later to complete the bloodless conquest. On 7 November, the French and their allies arrived near Hamelin (Hameln). Two days later, Louis pleaded illness and withdrew from the campaign.

Mortier left Dumonceau's Dutch division to carry out the Siege of Hameln. Though Dumonceau's 6,000 soldiers outnumbered by General Karl Ludwig von Lecoq's 10,000 defenders, the operation was a success. General Anne Jean Marie René Savary showed up on 19 November 1806 with a preliminary armistice in which all Prussian fortresses were to be surrendered. Though the document was not ratified, Savary used it to bully Lecoq into capitulating. Afterward the Dutch Division marched to Nienburg where it accepted the surrender of 2,911 Prussian soldiers on 26 November.

The VIII Corps was involved in the unsuccessful Siege of Kolberg from 20 March to 2 July 1807. Mortier's 14,000 men and 41 guns included the Fusilier-Chasseurs and Fusilier-Grenadiers of the Imperial Guard under Savary, Loison's French division of six infantry battalions and nine cavalry squadrons, General Charles Louis Dieudonné Grandjean's Dutch contingent with 12 battalions and two hussar regiments, six Italian battalions with supporting cavalry, two Polish battalions, and seven German battalions. The VIII Corps lost 5,000 killed, wounded, or died of illness. The defenders of the 230-gun Kolberg fortress lost 3,000 of the 6,000-man garrison killed, wounded, or died of disease. In June, however, Mortier was called to join the main army. He led 8,465 foot soldiers and 1,200 horsemen in the thick of the action at the Battle of Friedland on 14 June 1807. General Pierre-Louis Dupas led the all-French 1st Division, General Jean Henri Dombrowski commanded the all-Polish 2nd Division, and General Maurice Ignace Fresia directed the Dutch and Polish cavalry contingent.

=== 1812–1813 ===
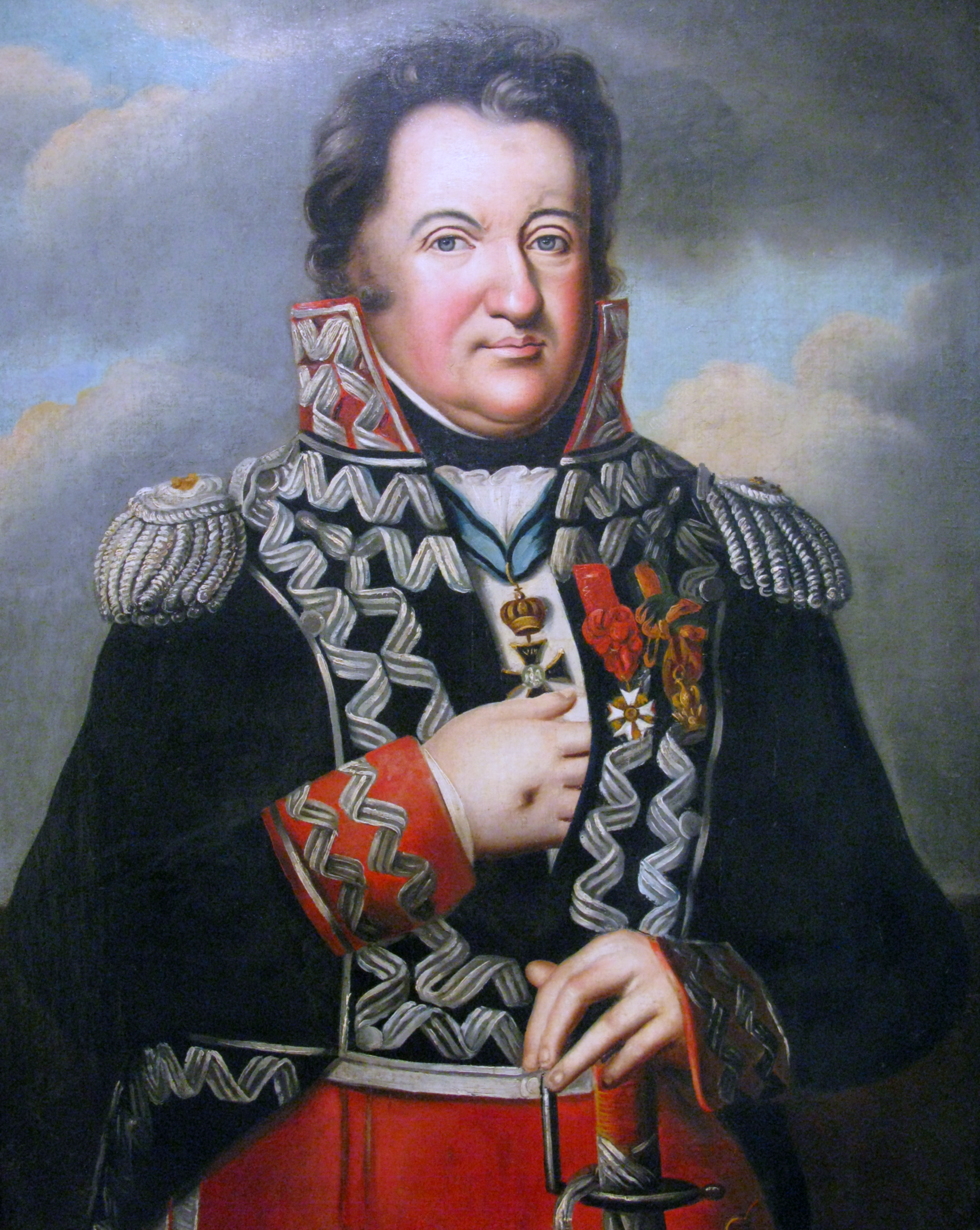
Jean Henri Dombrowski

The corps was reconstituted for the invasion of Russia and leadership was given to Vandamme. Together with the V Corps (Poles), VII Corps (Saxons), and IV Cavalry Corps, it was assigned to the 2nd Support Army under Jérôme Bonaparte. All the corps troops belonged to Jérôme's Kingdom of Westphalia. General Jean Victor Tharreau commanded the 1st Division and General von Ochs led the 2nd Division. On 24 June 1812, the corps consisted of 15,885 infantry in 18 battalions, 2,050 cavalry in 12 squadrons, and 34 artillery pieces. Jérôme's inexperience as a general was mitigated by the appointment of General Jean Gabriel Marchand as his chief of staff. Nevertheless, after being harshly criticized in a letter by his brother, Jérôme resigned his command on 14 July and went home. The command of the corps passed to Junot.

At the Battle of Valutino on 18 August 1812, the VIII Corps was ordered to cross the Dnieper River and block the retreat of the Russian Army toward Moscow. After taking a long time to cross the river, Junot failed to advance any farther, allowing the Russians to escape. At the Battle of Borodino on 7 September, the corps started out in reserve along with the Imperial Guard and the reserve cavalry. By 8:30 AM, Junot's men were sent into action. At 10:00 AM they joined the I Corps and III Corps in a massed attack on the flèches which was successful. Tharreau was among Borodino's many fatalities. That autumn, the Grande Armée withdrew from Moscow. By the time they reached Smolensk, the combined V and VIII Corps counted no more than 1,500 men.

In the following year, Prince Józef Poniatowski was appointed to command the VIII Corps, which was rebuilt as an all-Polish unit. At the Battle of Leipzig on 16–19 October 1813 the corps consisted of the 26th Infantry Division under General Kaminiecki, the 27th Infantry Division led by General of Jean Henri Dombrowski (Jan Henryk Dąbrowski), the 27th Light Cavalry Brigade under General Jan Nepomucen Umiński, and the 44 guns of the corps artillery under Colonel Redel. Marshal Joachim Murat assumed command of a wing that included the II, V, and VIII Corps plus cavalry. His orders were to delay the advance of the Army of Bohemia from the south. On 16 October, the 26th Division fought near the villages of Markkleeberg and Dölitz in the southern part of the battlefield. Meanwhile, Dombrowski's division became involved in the fighting to the north. During the rear guard fighting on the 19th, a panicky sapper prematurely blew up the bridge over the White Elster River, trapping the VII, VIII, and XI Corps in Leipzig. The wounded Poniatowski drowned trying to cross the river and the encircled troops surrendered.

== Order of battle ==
=== Dürenstein: November 1805 ===
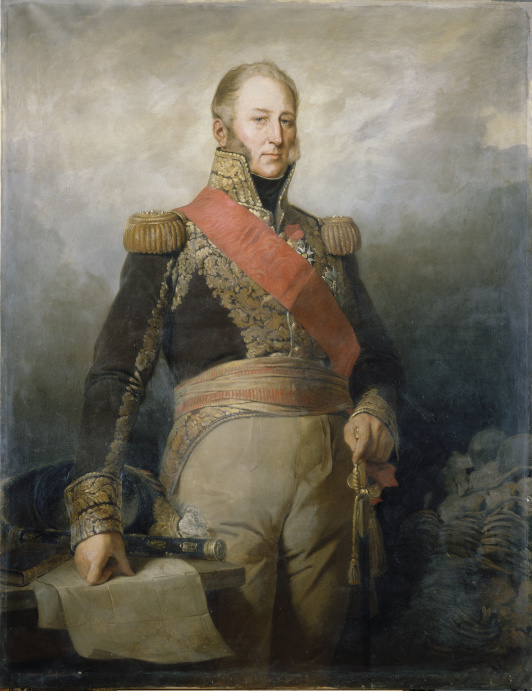
Édouard Mortier

Marshal Édouard Mortier

- 1st Division (VI Corps): General of Division Pierre Dupont de l'Etang
  - Brigadiers: Generals of Brigade Marie François Rouyer, Jean Gabriel Marchand
    - 9th Light Infantry Regiment (2 battalions)
    - 32nd Line Infantry Regiment (2 battalions)
    - 96th Line Infantry Regiment (2 battalions)
    - 1st Hussar Regiment (3 squadrons)
    - Artillery: 3 guns
- 2nd Division (V Corps): General of Division Honoré Théodore Maxime Gazan
  - Brigadiers: Generals of Brigade Jean François Graindorge, François Frédéric Campana
    - 4th Light Infantry Regiment (3 battalions)
    - 54th Line Infantry Regiment (3 battalions)
    - 100th Line Infantry Regiment (3 battalions)
    - 103rd Line Infantry Regiment (3 battalions)
    - 4th Dragoon Regiment (3 squadrons)
    - Artillery: 3 guns
- 3rd Division (II Corps): General of Division Jean-Baptiste Dumonceau (not engaged)
- 1st Dragoon Division (Cavalry Corps): General of Division Louis Klein (not engaged)

Source: Smith, Digby (1998). The Napoleonic Wars Data Book. London: Greenhill. p. 213. ISBN 1-85367-276-9.

=== Hameln: November 1806 ===
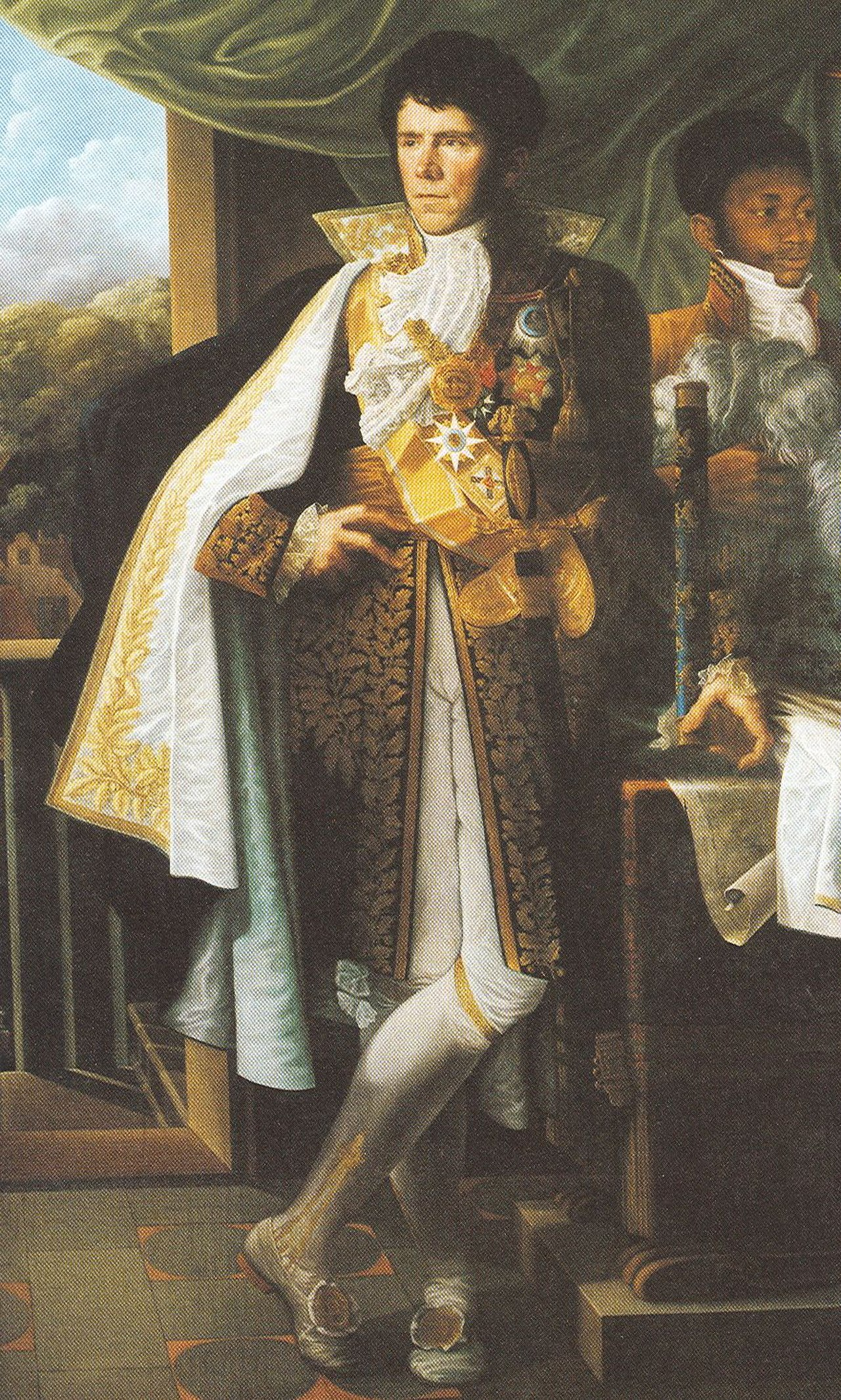
Jean-Baptiste Dumonceau

Marshal Édouard Mortier

- Division: General of Division Jean-Baptiste Dumonceau (6,000, 12 guns)
  - 1st Brigade: General of Brigade Crass
    - 1st Dutch Jäger Regiment (1st Battalion)
    - 2nd Dutch Jäger Regiment (1st Battalion)
    - 3rd Dutch Jäger Regiment (1st Battalion)
  - 2nd Brigade: General of Brigade von Heldring
    - 2nd Dutch Line Infantry Regiment (2 battalions)
    - 3rd Dutch Line Infantry Regiment (2 battalions)
    - 4th Dutch Line Infantry Regiment (1 battalion)
  - 3rd Brigade: General of Brigade von Hasselt
    - 7th Dutch Line Infantry Regiment (2 battalions)
    - 8th Dutch Line Infantry Regiment (1 battalion)
  - 4th Brigade: General of Brigade Mascheck
    - 3rd Dutch Hussar Regiment
    - Two horse artillery batteries

Source: Smith, Digby (1998). The Napoleonic Wars Data Book. London: Greenhill. p. 233. ISBN 1-85367-276-9.

=== Borodino: September 1812 ===
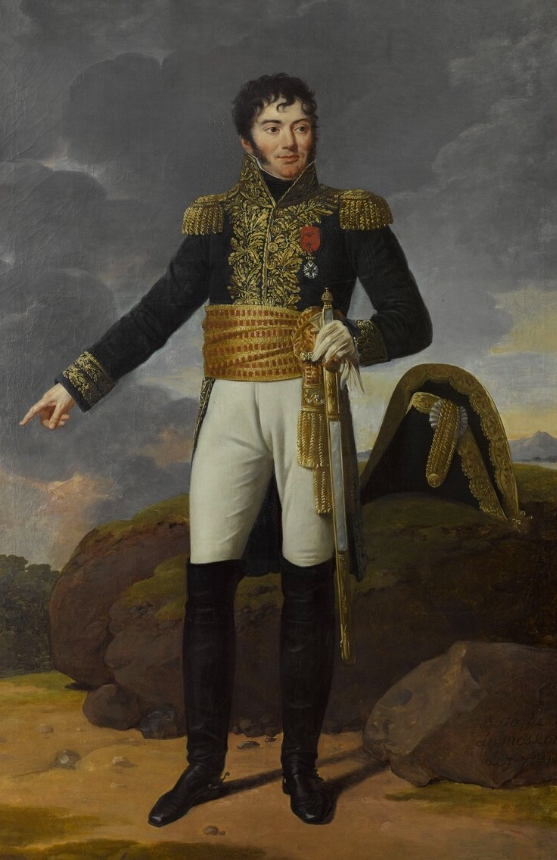
Jean Victor Tharreau

General of Division Jean-Andoche Junot (8,900, 30 guns)

- 23rd Infantry Division: General of Division Jean Victor Tharreau †
  - 1st Brigade: General of Brigade François Auguste Damas †
    - 3rd Westphalian Light Infantry Battalion
    - 2nd Westphalian Line Infantry Regiment (2 battalions, 2 guns)
    - 6th Westphalian Line Infantry Regiment (2 battalions, 2 guns)
  - 2nd Brigade: General of Brigade von Borstell
    - 2nd Westphalian Light Infantry Battalion
    - 3rd Westphalian Line Infantry Regiment (2 battalions, 2 guns)
    - 7th Westphalian Line Infantry Regiment (3 battalions, 2 guns)
  - Divisional Artillery:
    - 1st Westphalian Foot Artillery Company (8 guns)
- 24th Infantry Division: General of Division von Ochs
  - 1st Brigade: General of Brigade Legras
    - Westphalian Guard Grenadier Infantry Battalion
    - Westphalian Guard Chasseur Infantry Battalion
    - Westphalian Guard Chasseur-Carabinier Infantry Battalion
    - 1st Westphalian Light Infantry Battalion
  - Divisional Artillery:
    - 2nd Westphalian Foot Artillery Company (8 guns)
    - 1st Westphalian Guard Horse Artillery Company (4 guns)
- Corps Cavalry: General of Brigade von Hammerstein
  - 24th Light Cavalry Brigade: General of Brigade von Hammerstein
    - 1st Westphalian Hussar Regiment (4 squadrons)
    - 2nd Westphalian Hussar Regiment (4 squadrons)
  - Guard Cavalry Brigade: General of Brigade Wolf
    - Westphalian Guard Chevau-léger Regiment (4 squadrons)
- Corps Artillery: Major Schulz
  - 1st Westphalian Guard Horse Artillery Company (2 guns)

Source: Mikaberizde, Alexander; Vovsi, Eman (2007). "The Battle of Borodino: Order of Battle of the Allied Army". The Napoleon Series.

=== Leipzig: October 1813 ===
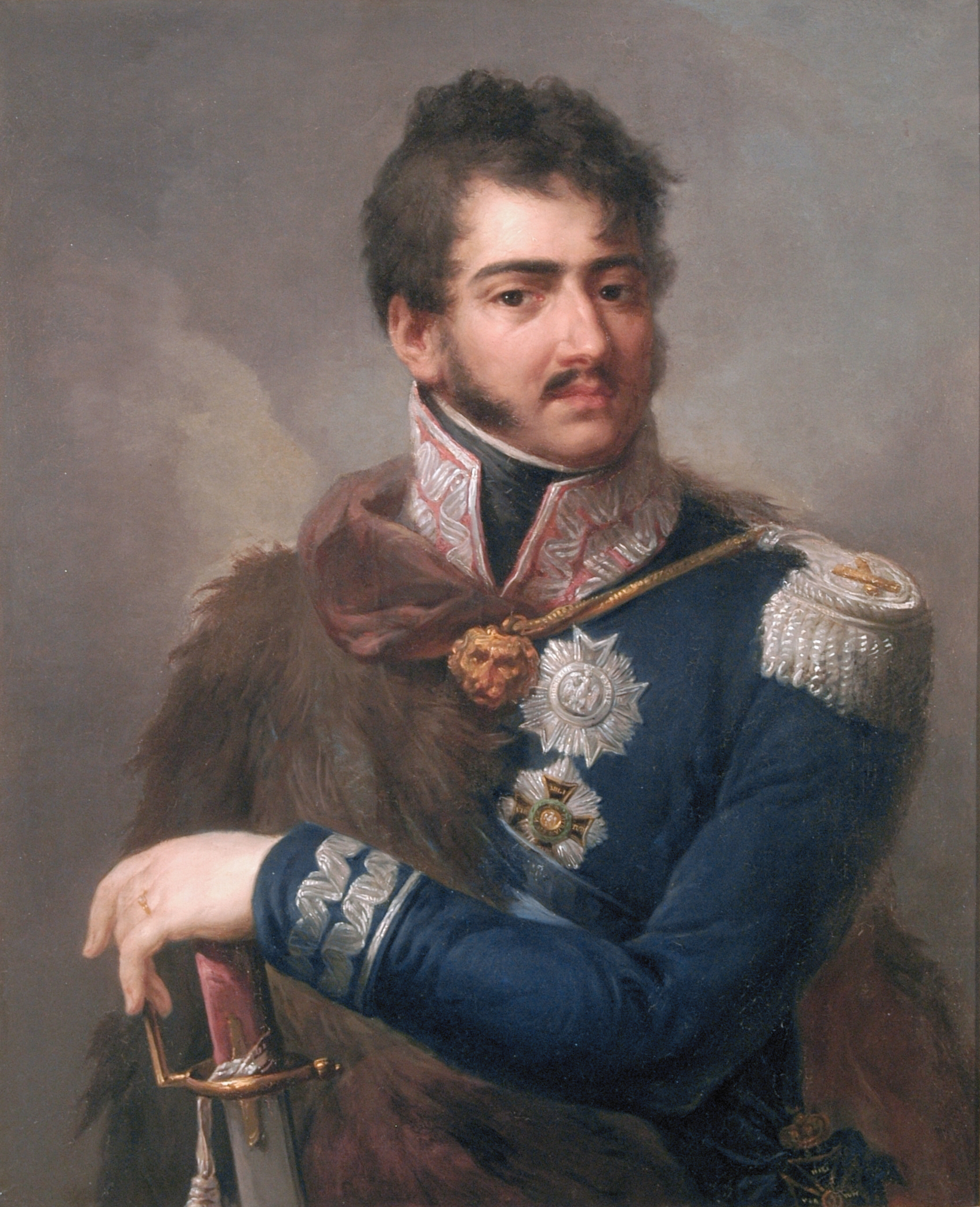
Józef Poniatowski

Marshal Józef Poniatowski †

- 26th Infantry Division: General of Division Ludwik Kaminiecki
  - Brigade: General of Brigade Jan Kanty Julian Sierawski
    - 1st Polish Infantry Regiment (2 battalions)
    - 16th Polish Infantry Regiment (2 battalions)
    - Legion of the Vistula (2 battalions)
  - Brigade: General of Brigade Casimir Malachowski
    - 8th Polish Infantry Regiment (2 battalions)
    - 15th Polish Infantry Regiment (2 battalions)
  - Divisional Artillery:
    - 5th Polish Foot Artillery Battery
    - 7th Polish Foot Artillery Battery
    - 14th Polish Foot Artillery Battery
- 27th Infantry Division: General of Division Jean Henri Dombrowski
  - Brigade: General of Brigade Edward Zoltowski
    - 2nd Polish Infantry Regiment (2 battalions)
    - 14th Polish Infantry Regiment (2 battalions)
  - Brigade: General of Brigade Stefan Grabowski
    - 12th Polish Infantry Regiment (2 battalions)
  - Divisional Artillery:
    - 10th Polish Foot Artillery Battery
    - Polish Horse Artillery Battery
- 27th Light Cavalry Brigade: General of Brigade Jan Nepomucen Umiński
  - 14th Cuirassier Regiment (2 squadrons)
  - Krakus Regiment (4 squadrons)
- Corps Artillery: Colonel Jakob Antoni Redel
  - 11th Polish Foot Battery

Source: Millar, Stephen (2004). "French Order of Battle at Leipzig: The Northern Sector". The Napoleon Series.
Source: Millar, Stephen (2004). "French Order of Battle at Leipzig: The Southern Sector". The Napoleon Series.
