= V Corps (Grande Armée) =

Military Unit of Grande Armée

- Active: 1805–1807; 1812–1814
- Country: First French Empire
- Branch: French Imperial Army
- Size: Corps
- Engagements: War of the Third Coalition; War of the Fourth Coalition; Russian campaign War of the Sixth Coalition

Commanders
- Notable commanders: Jean-Baptiste Drouet; Jean Lannes; Jacques Lauriston; François Joseph Lefebvre; André Masséna; Édouard Mortier; Józef Poniatowski; Anne Jean Marie René Savary; Jean Rapp

The V Corps of the Grande Armée was a French military corps unit that existed during the Napoleonic Wars. The corps was originally formed in 1805 and was reorganized several times until it was dissolved in 1814.

== History ==
From 1805–1807, the corps composed mostly of French troops, and was commanded by Marshals Jean Lannes, Édouard Mortier, François Joseph Lefebvre, and André Masséna as well as Général de Division Anne Jean Marie René Savary.

=== Polish Corps d'Armée ===
In 1812, the V Corps was made up entirely of Polish soldiers from the Duchy of Warsaw under the command of General Józef Poniatowski. It was one of several non-French corps of the Grande Armée and at its peak consisted of around 36,000 soldiers. The corps took part in Napoleon's invasion of Russia and fought in the Battle of Smolensk and the Battle of Borodino.

The corps suffered heavy casualties during the retreat, but managed to reach Warsaw and was later reinforced with new recruits. In 1813, the corps was sent to Saxony, passing Bohemia. The corps was temporary disbanded with the remaining troops and Poniatowski reassigned to the VIII Corps.

=== Revival ===
After the disastrous Russian campaign, the V Corps was rebuilt in Magdeburg from newly formed French units in the spring of 1813. These troops were under the command of General Jacques Lauriston. Participating in the War of the Sixth Coalition the corps was disbanded again after Napoleon's abdication.

== Organization ==
The V Corps varied in strength and organization. In the beginning of each campaign it had:

- 14,000 French in 1805
- 18,000 French in 1806–1807
- 36,000 Polish in 1812
- 20,000 French in 1813

== 1805 ==
- Infantry Division – General Louis-Gabriel Suchet
- Combined Grenadier Division – General Nicolas Oudinot
  - 1st Brigade under Général de Brigade Mortièret
    - 2nd Line Infantry Regiment
    - 9th Line Infantry Regiment
    - 11th Line Infantry Regiment
    - 58th Line Infantry Regiment
    - 81st Line Infantry Regiment
  - 2nd Brigade
    - 2nd Light Infantry Regiment
    - 3rd Light Infantry Regiment
    - 28^{e} régiment d'infanterie légère
    - 31^{e} régiment d'infanterie légère
  - 3rd Brigade
    - 12th Light Infantry Regiment
    - 15th Light Infantry Regiment
- Light Cavalry Division – General Anne-François-Charles Trelliard, then Antoine Charles Louis de Lasalle

== 1806–1807 ==
- Infantry Division – General Louis-Gabriel Suchet
- Infantry Division – General Gazan
- Light Cavalry Division – General Trelliard

== 1812 ==
- 16th Infantry Division – General Józef Zajączek, then Izydor Krasinski and Franciszek Paszkowski
- 17th Infantry Division – General Jan Henryk Dąbrowski
- 18th Infantry Division – General Ludwik Kamieniecki, then Karol Kniaziewicz
- Cavalry Division – General Michal Ignacy Kamieński.

== 1813 ==
- 16th Infantry Division – General Nicolas Joseph Maison
- 17th Infantry Division – General Jacques-Pierre-Louis Puthod
- 19th Infantry Division – General Marie Joseph Rochembeau

== Sources ==
- Rapp, Jean, comte (1823). Memoirs of General Count Rapp, first aide-de-camp to Napoleon. London, UK: Rapp family.
- Town notes of Strasbourg
- Letters of Napoleon
- Couderc Napoléon, ses dernières armées page 504 Bis, situation V Corps on 26 April 1815
