= First Battle of Bar-sur-Aube =

1814 battle during the War of the Sixth Coalition

- Part of the Campaign of France of the Sixth Coalition
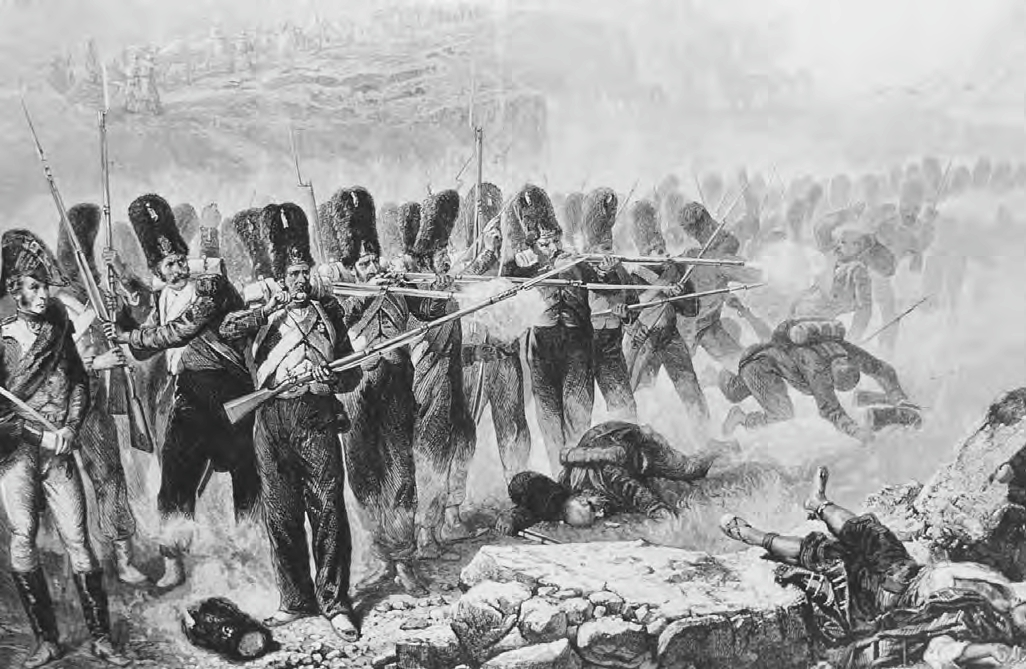
- French Old Guard infantry in combat wearing their bearskin caps.
Date	24 January 1814
Location	Bar-sur-Aube, French Empire 48°16′N 04°43′E
Result	See § Aftermath section

Belligerents
(First French Empire) France	(Austrian Empire) Austria (Kingdom of Württemberg) Württemberg

Commanders and leaders
(First French Empire) Édouard Mortier	Alexander I (Note: Supreme commander-in-chief. (Russian troops did not participate.)) (Austrian Empire) Ignaz Gyulai (Austrian Empire) Karl Schwarzenberg (Kingdom of Württemberg) Prince of Württemberg

Strength
13,000–14,200; 50 guns	Austria: 15,000; 56 guns Württemberg: 12,000–13,000; 24 guns Total: 25,000–28,000; 80 guns

Casualties and losses
700–1,700 killed, wounded, or captured	1,000–1,400 killed, wounded, or captured
- Location within France

War of the Sixth Coalition:
Campaign in north-east France
current battle
Napoleon in command
Napoleon not in command

The First Battle of Bar-sur-Aube (24 January 1814) was fought during the War of the Sixth Coalition when Marshal Édouard Mortier, duc de Trévise's corps of French Imperial Guards defended against an Austrians corps under Ignaz Gyulai and a Württemberger corps led by Crown Prince Frederick William of Württemberg. After holding his main defensive positions in stiff fighting, Mortier withdrew his elite troops during the night and retreated to Troyes. Bar-sur-Aube is located 53 kilometres (33 mi) east of Troyes.

The 1814 Campaign opened with an invasion of eastern France by the main Coalition army led by Austrian Field Marshal Karl Philipp, Prince of Schwarzenberg and a second army led by Prussian Field Marshal Gebhard Leberecht von Blücher. The weak French defending forces were pushed back without too much trouble, except for Mortier's guardsmen near Langres. These crack troops made a fighting withdrawal to Bar-sur-Aube where they offered battle in a strong position. Two days after the clash, Emperor Napoleon joined his reeling forces and the major fighting began.

== Invasion ==
For Emperor Napoleon the Battle of Leipzig was a catastrophe. Of his army, only 60,000–70,000 survivors retreated to the west bank of the Rhine River in November 1813. Almost 100,000 of Napoleon's soldiers were left behind in German fortresses and all his German allies abandoned him and joined the Coalition. In the 1814 campaign, Napoleon could act with singleness of purpose since he was both the political and military leader of France. The Coalition's major powers had divergent interests. Czar Alexander I of Russia wished to seize Paris and overthrow Napoleon. King Frederick William III of Prussia was ready to go along with the czar and his countrymen were eager to avenge years of French occupation and humiliation. Emperor Francis I of Austria was less keen on the overthrow of Napoleon, who was married to his daughter Marie Louise and Austria already stood to regain all the territories lost to France. Francis and his minister Klemens von Metternich feared Russia and Prussia might gain too much power if France were crushed.

The Coalition planned to send the main Army of Bohemia under Prince Karl Philipp of Schwarzenberg to invade France via Switzerland and march to Langres. The Army of Silesia under Gebhard Leberecht von Blücher was ordered to cross the middle Rhine and advance on Schwarzenberg's right while the Army of the North invaded the Netherlands. The Coalition armies counted 278,000 Russians, 230,000 Austrians, 162,000 Prussians, 197,000 other Germans and 20,000 Swedes. To oppose this gigantic force, Napoleon had Marshal Claude Perrin Victor with 10,000 men on the upper Rhine, Marshal Auguste de Marmont with 13,000 troops, Horace François Sébastiani with 4,500 more on the middle Rhine, Marshal Jacques MacDonald with 11,500 on the lower Rhine and Nicolas Joseph Maison with 15,000 in the Netherlands. Charles Antoine Morand and another 15,000 troops were besieged in Mainz.

At first Napoleon hoped that the invading Allied armies numbered only 80,000 men but they fielded 200,000 troops, to which the French emperor could only oppose 70,000 soldiers. Among Schwarzenberg's formations were the Austrian III Corps under Ignaz Gyulai with 14,732 soldiers and 56 artillery pieces and the Württemberg IV Corps under Crown Prince Frederick William of Württemberg with 14,000 men and 24 guns. To defend his regime, Napoleon planned to conscript 936,000 Frenchmen but only a third were actually called up. Of these, only about one-eighth fought because muskets were not available; large numbers resisted the draft. The emperor eventually drew from his southern armies 11,015 foot soldiers, 3,420 horsemen and 40 guns from Marshal Jean-de-Dieu Soult and 8,051 infantry, 2,132 cavalry and 18 guns from Marshal Louis-Gabriel Suchet. Because of the French generals' weak forces, the Coalition armies' advance from the frontiers to the Marne River was hardly opposed at all.

== Operations ==
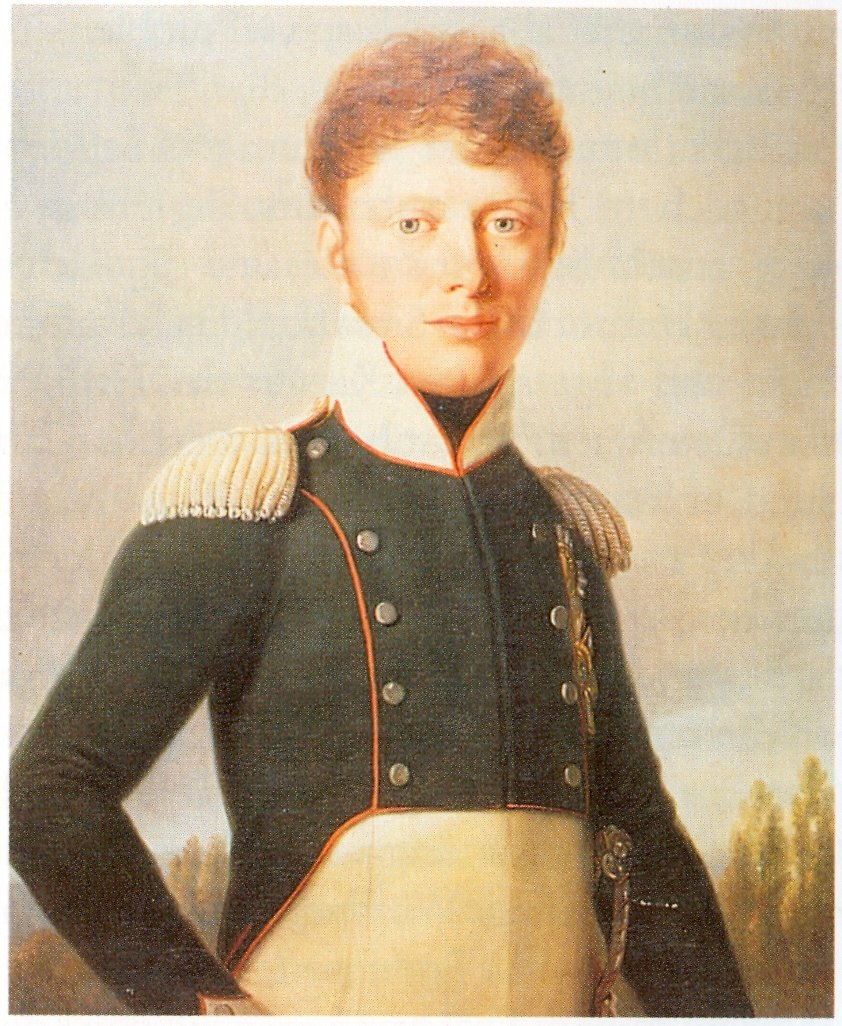
Prince Frederick William

Langres was held by Marshal Édouard Mortier, duc de Trévise with units of the Imperial Guard. There were 2,900 troopers of the 1st Guard Cavalry Division under Louis-Marie Leferrière-Levêque and 4,800 men of the 1st Old Guard Division under Louis Friant. On the evening of 12 January 1814, at Chatenay-Vaudin, 300 guardsmen surprised a strong Austrian patrol from Gyulai's III Corps, capturing 27 soldiers and killing the rest. The next day, French probes captured 60 Austrians at Chaudenay and killed 44 Bavarians at Longeau-Percey while losing only 3 killed and 20 wounded. Intimidated by Mortier's aggressive patrolling, Gyulai stopped for several days and waited for reinforcements. On the night of 16/17 January, Mortier evacuated Langres and retreated north to Chaumont. Urged by the townspeople, the small Langres garrison surrendered to Gyulai's troops at 6:00 pm on 17 January.

Schwarzenberg sent the Russian 3rd Cuirassier Division under Ilya Mikhailovich Duka down the west bank of the Marne toward Chaumont and the Crown Prince of Württemberg's IV Corps down the east bank. On 18 January, Duka's horsemen charged straight into an ambush at Marnay-sur-Marne. After a number of losses, the cavalry fell back and called on Gyulai for infantry support. That day near Chaumont, the Württemberg 9th Jäger Battalion tried to capture the bridge at Choignes in a downpour. The Germans rushed across and nearly captured the village but were routed by a Guard Foot Grenadier bayonet attack that inflicted numerous casualties and took 60 prisoners. The action ended in an inconclusive artillery duel. Mortier was in a strong position but anxious that the continual retreats of his fellow marshals would cause his forces to become trapped. He decided to withdraw north-west to Colombey-les-Deux-Églises on 19 January.

Schwarzenberg had an opportunity to drive forward and crush the French forces before him. Instead he called a halt at Langres while diverting Hieronymus Karl Colloredo-Mansfeld's I Corps and Prince Frederick of Hesse-Homburg's Reserve Corps to seize Dijon to the south. Militarily this move made little sense but he was carrying out the instructions of Metternich to avoid major fighting. By nature a cautious general, Schwarzenberg was jittery about his lengthening supply lines stretching back to the Rhine, partly explaining the Army of Bohemia's slow 5 mi (8.0 km) per day advance.

== Battle ==
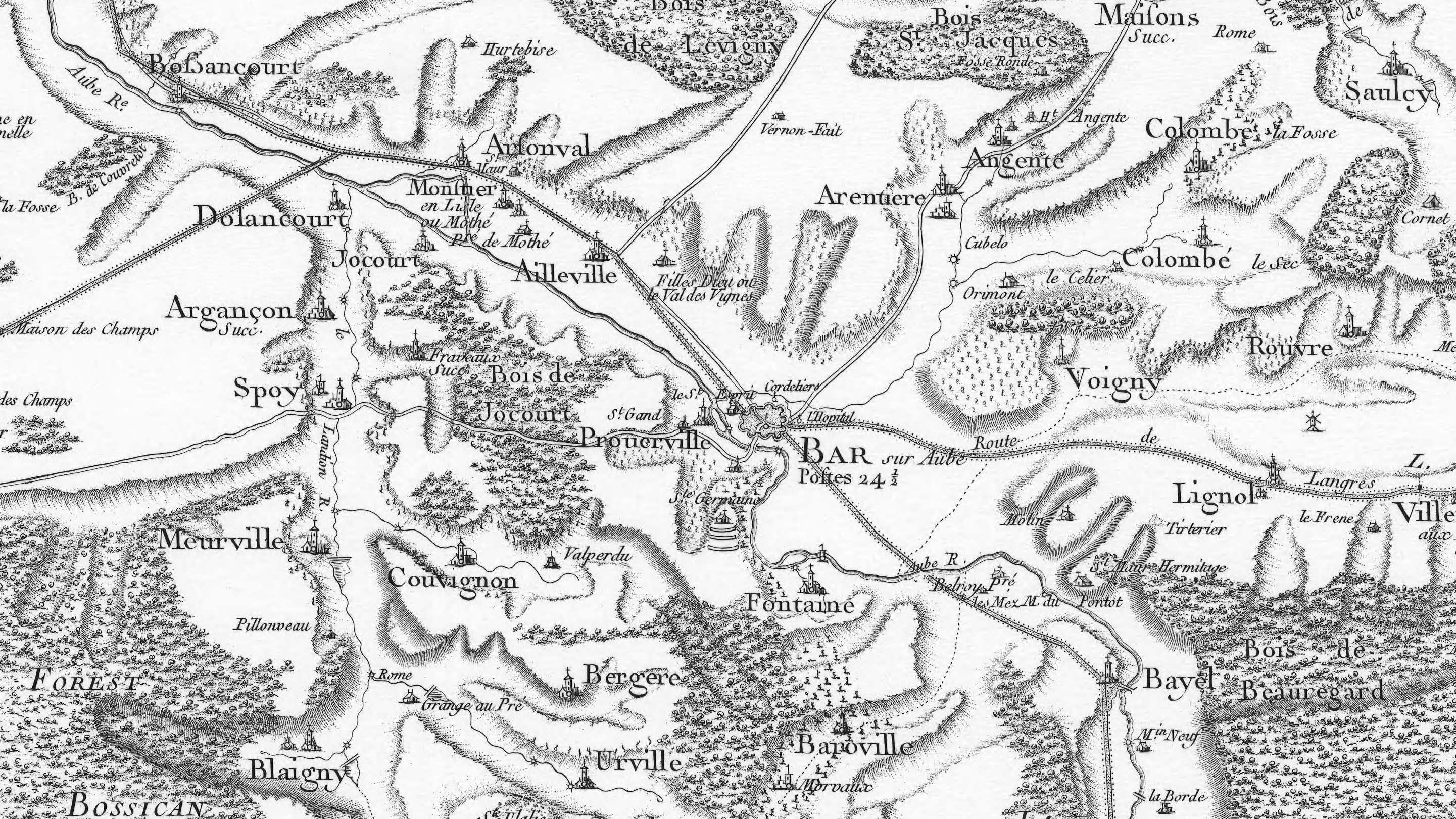
Colombey-les-Deux-Églises is off the right edge of this Napoleonic era map of Bar-sur-Aube (labeled Bar in center).

Mortier reached Bar-sur-Aube on 20 January and that afternoon his force was joined by the 2nd Old Guard Division led by Charles-Joseph Christiani and the 113th Line Infantry Regiment under Louis Auguste Victor de Bourmont. Mortier complained in a letter to Napoleon's Chief of staff Marshal Louis-Alexandre Berthier, that Christiani's division had fewer than 3,000 men. Bourmont's regiment counted 1,800 soldiers. On 21 January, Mortier got a message that Napoleon was approaching his position and this made the marshal more determined to fight it out. During the next few days major units of the Army of Bohemia remained inert though both the III and IV Corps gathered intelligence of Mortier's positions from patrols. The arrival of Czar Alexander at the front on 22 January forced Schwarzenberg's hand. Alexander urged Schwarzenberg to advance and when the Austrian made weak excuses, the czar accused him of sabotaging the campaign. To placate Alexander, Schwarzenberg agreed to a plan of attack that Gyulai and the Crown Prince submitted to his headquarters.

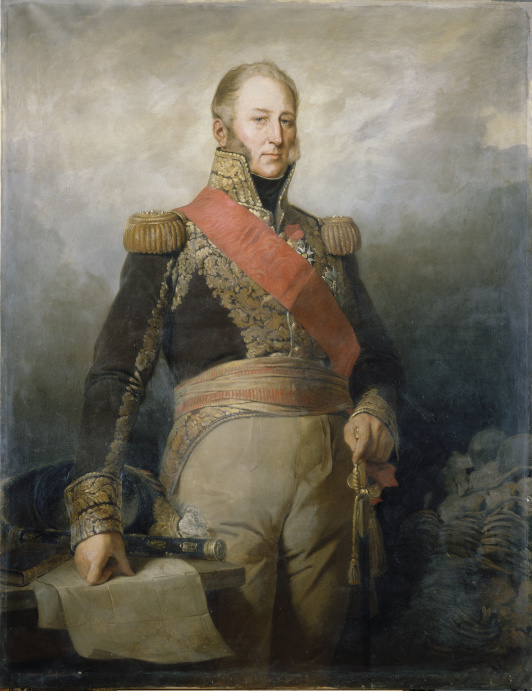
Édouard Mortier

On 23 January, Mortier became aware of Allied movements that indicated there would be a fight the following day. He found that several thousand Don Cossacks under Matvei Platov lurked at Doulevant-le-Château only 15 miles (24 km) to the north-east. He sent 500 infantry and 500 cavalry north to Trémilly where they drove off Platov's horsemen that evening. Mortier sent Bourmont's 113th Line to guard the bridge over the Aube at Dolancourt just north-west of Bar-sur-Aube. The Horse Grenadiers of the Imperial Guard were posted between Dolancourt and Bar. One infantry regiment and three field guns watched his line of retreat near Spoy to the west of Bar. Two battalions and the Guard Chasseurs à Cheval held Fontaine south-east of Bar. The 2nd Division plus one battalion of the 1st Division were deployed across the Chaumont highway east of Bar supported by a 20-gun battery. Guarding the Boudelin Bridge to the east of Fontaine were 14 artillery pieces. Seven guns covered the bridge over the Aube in Bar. The remaining six field pieces were with Louis-Michel Letort de Lorville's four battalions and four squadrons at Colombey-les-Deux-Églises to the east of Bar. Mortier had 13,000 troops watching the approaches to Bar from the east and south. Another source credited the French with 14,200 troops.

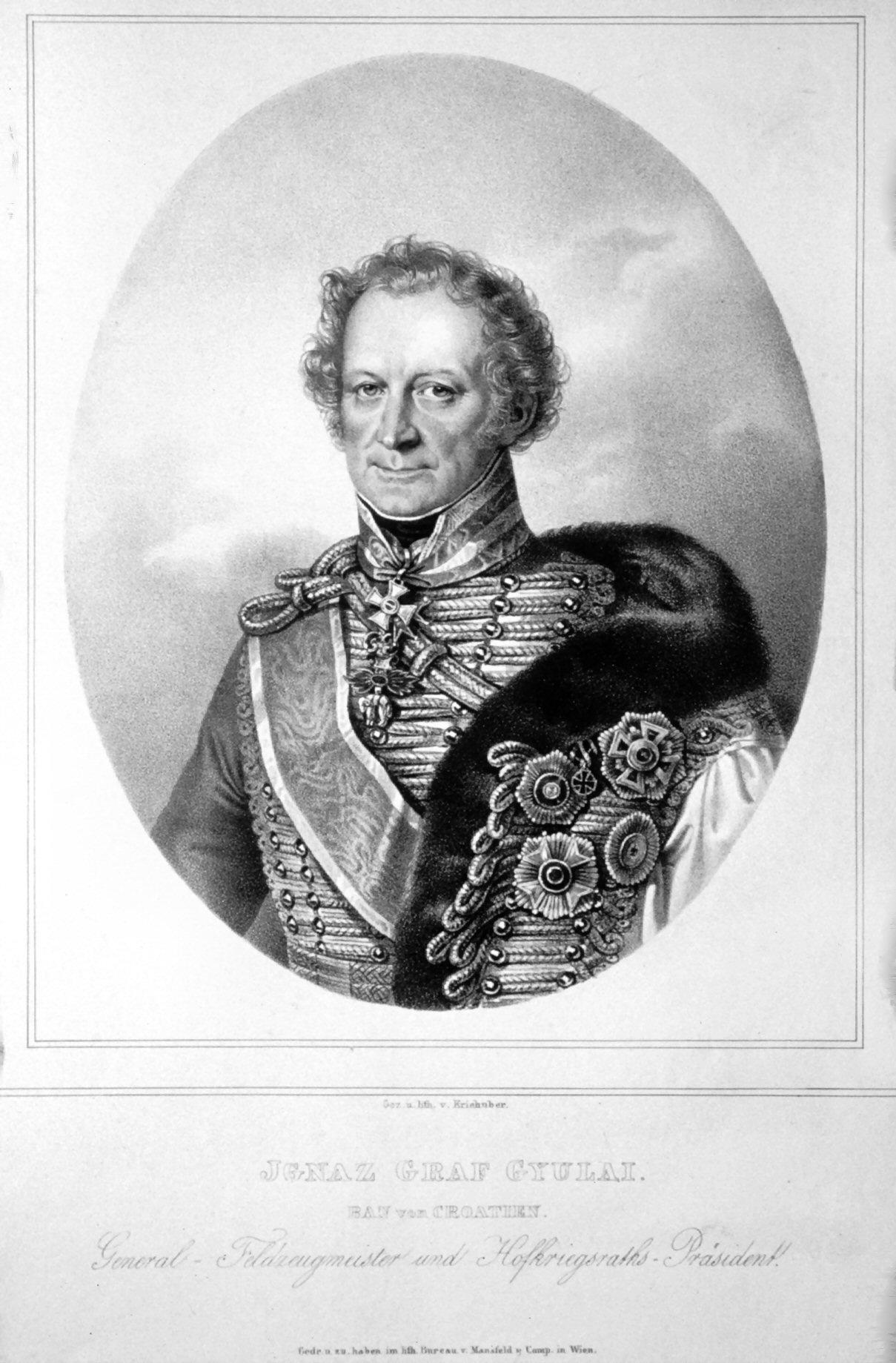
Ignaz Gyulai

According to their plan, Gyulai would assault Bar-sur-Aube at the same time that the Crown Prince attacked Colombey-les-Deux-Églises and Platov turned Mortier's left flank. To trap Letort's force, Ludwig von Stockmayer with three light infantry battalions, four cavalry squadrons and one horse artillery battery set out from Juzennecourt at 9:00 am and marched west to Montheries. At that village, they planned to turn north through the Dhuits Forest and come into the main highway west of Colombey-les-Deux-Églises while other forces would attack Letort frontally. At 10:00 am, Karl August Maxmilian von Jett with two battalions of the 7th Infantry Regiment, four squadrons of Jäger cavalry, one squadron of hussars and one horse battery began to advance along the Chaumont-Bar highway. Jett was supported by one battalion of the 6th Infantry, the 3rd Dragoons and one foot artillery battery. Inexplicably, eight battalions, one cavalry regiment and one foot battery were left at Chaumont without orders. Including those left behind, the IV Corps numbered 12,000–13,000 men. The Crown Prince directed the support column in person. At 11:00 am Gyulai's columns began to come into action against the Mortier's southern defenses.

By some staff blunder, Stockmayer's column left Montheries without a guide and missed the correct road. Instead of coming in behind Letort's troops, it emerged from the Dhuits Forest on the south side of Colombey-les-Deux-Églises. Spotting the danger, Letort evaded the trap and fell back toward Lignol. The Crown Prince led his 2nd and 4th Cavalry Regiments forward in attempt to cut the French off but supports arrived in time to help Letort pull back to the main French defense line near Voigny. An attempted Württemberger advance was stopped by Mortier's 20-gun battery. The Crown Prince decided not to engage the French Guard infantry and withdrew his troops to Lignol, until Gyulai's advance showed some progress and conducted an artillery duel until dark. The German gunners managed to blow up two ammunition wagons and put some French guns out of action. Platov's Cossacks declined to cooperate with the Württembergers.

Gyulai conducted his assault on the south side with more intensity. His troops marched north along the west bank of the Aube in two columns. The right column under Louis Aloysius, Prince of Hohenlohe-Waldenburg-Bartenstein cleared the French outposts from Bayel while the left column under Joseph von Haecht pushed the French from Baroville. Hohenlohe's division repeatedly tried to storm the Boudelin bridge but each assault withered under the fire of the 14-gun battery. At Fontaine, Haecht's division overran the village three times but each time they were driven out by Christiani's guardsmen. Gyulai tried to break off the combat but found his own troops under attack by the French in a prolonged struggle for the Aube crossings. At 6:00 pm the Austrians captured the Boudelin bridge but Gyulai decided not to try to cut off Mortier's retreat. The Austrian general became angry that his Württemberger allies remained in place while his corps bore the brunt of the combat; evening ended the fighting.

== Aftermath ==
One authority stated that the Allies sustained 1,400 casualties out of 12,500 men but listed only Austrian III Corps units. French losses were given as 500 killed and wounded and 200 captured out of an engaged total of 5,885 infantry, 2,567 cavalry and 50 guns. Another source asserted that each side suffered about 1,000 casualties. The French took about 100 Allied prisoners. A third source gave Allied losses as 1,500 killed and wounded plus 100 captured. The French reported losing only 400–500 casualties but an Allied officer claimed that the French lost 1,000 killed and wounded plus 200 captured. The same officer counted 900 Württemberger casualties which suggested that they fought harder than their allies realized. The Austrians reported 647 killed and wounded and 190 missing.

At 11:00 pm, Mortier notified Napoleon of his plans to retreat to Vendeuvre-sur-Barse and immediately sent orders for his troops to begin evacuating Bar-sur-Aube. The march discipline of the Imperial Guard was so good that the Allies were unaware of their departure until the next morning. Gyulai's corps did not begin the pursuit until the afternoon then it quickly halted at the broken bridge at Spoy. Gyulai mistakenly reported that the French retreated to Châlons-sur-Marne when Mortier was heading for Troyes. The Crown Prince's troops halted and bivouacked in the area. After interrogating his prisoners, Mortier concluded that the Crown Prince's corps numbered 12,000–15,000 men while Gyulai had 30,000. He reported to the emperor that the Allies employed 60 artillery pieces against him including heavy 12-pounder batteries. On 26 January, Napoleon arrived at Châlons-sur-Marne and the Battle of Brienne was fought on 29 January 1814.

Historian David G. Chandler stated that Mortier suffered a "narrow defeat" while Francis Loraine Petre reported that the action was "indecisive". On the other hand, Digby Smith called the battle a "French victory".

== Forces ==
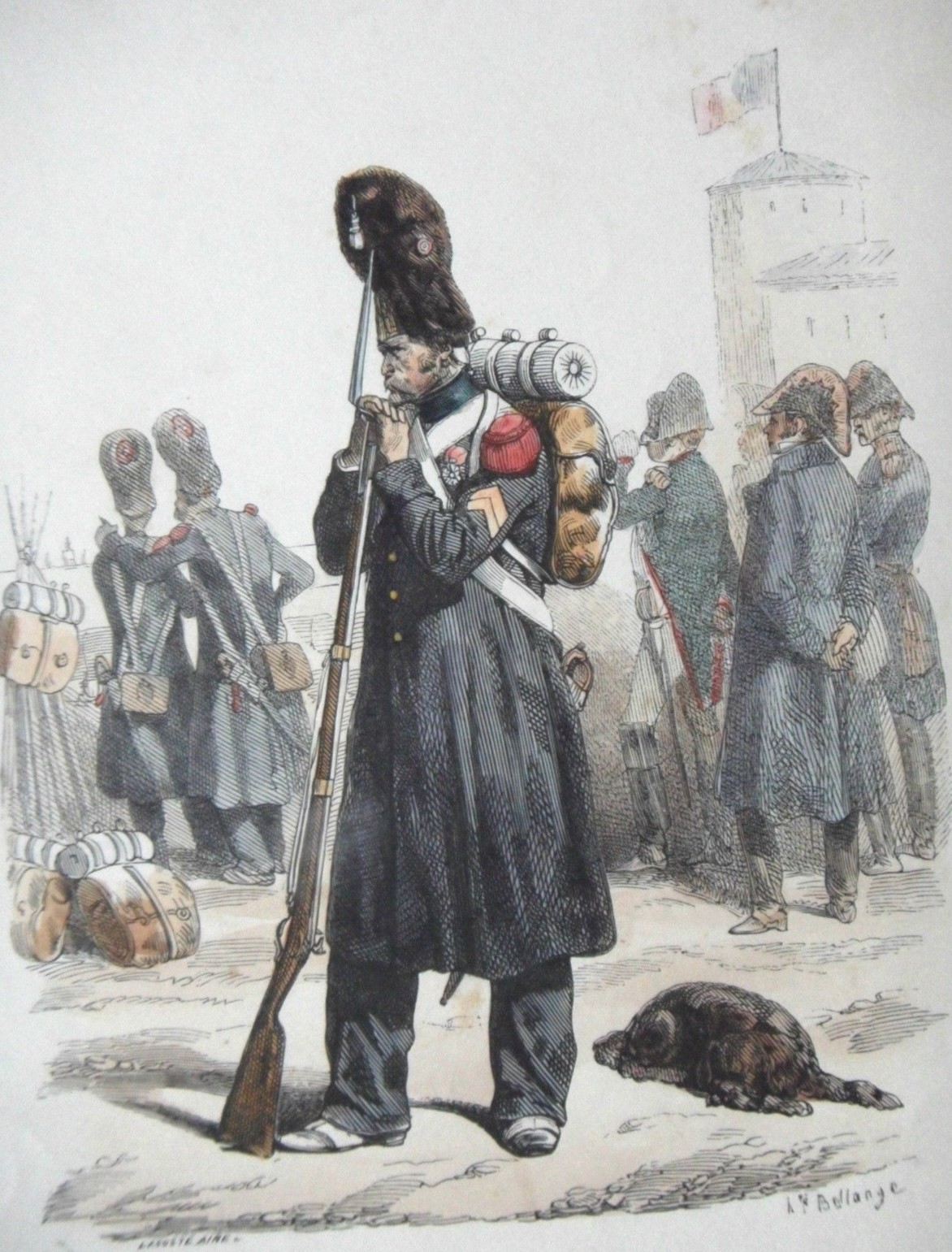
Old Guard infantryman

=== French Order of Battle ===
According to a report dated 25 January 1814, the day after the battle, General of Division Friant's 1st Old Guard Division numbered 4,705 soldiers, including the 1st Foot Chasseur Regiment, 1,265 men, 2nd Foot Chasseurs, 898 men, 1st Foot Grenadiers, 1,393 men, and 2nd Foot Grenadiers, 1,044 men. Each regiment consisted of 1st and 2nd Battalions and there were also 105 Guard sappers. General of Brigade Christiani's 2nd Old Guard Division numbered 3,878 soldiers, including the Flanquer-Chasseur Regiment, 1,042 men, Flanquer-Grenadiers, 285 men, Velites of Turin, 333 men, Velites of Florence, 164 men, Fusilier-Chasseurs, 1,366 men, and Fusilier-Grenadiers, 688 men.

General of Division Laferrière-Levêque's 1st Guard Cavalry Division was made up of 2,228 horsemen, including the Guard Chasseurs à Cheval, 585 troopers, Guard Dragoons, 734 troopers, and Guard Horse Grenadiers, 909 troopers. General of Brigade Bourmont's 1st, 3rd and 4th Battalions of the 113th Line counted 2,173 troops. The Guard artillery included seven foot artillery companies with 459 gunners, four horse artillery companies with 319 gunners, an artillery train with 665 drivers and 21 pontoon men. The French employed 50 artillery pieces.

=== Austrian Order of Battle ===
In a report from 1 January 1814, Feldzeugmeister Gyulai's III Austrian Corps numbered 15,261 troops in three divisions led by Feldmarschall-Leutnants Louis Charles Folliot de Crenneville, Prince Hohenlohe and Jean Charles Hennequin de Fresnel. The corps reserve artillery included three foot batteries armed with six 12-pound and 12 6-pound cannons. Crenneville's division consisted of two brigades supported by a horse artillery battery of six 6-pounders. General-major Haecht commanded seven squadrons of the Klenau Chevau-léger Regiment and one battalion of the St. George Warasdiner Grenz Infantry Regiment. The second brigade of General-major Joseph Friedrich von der Trenck consisted of six squadrons of the Rosenberg Dragoon Regiment and another St. George Grenz battalion.

Hohenlohe's division was made up of two brigades, each with a foot artillery battery of eight 6-pound cannons. General-major Franz Splényi de Miháldy's brigade had two battalions each of Infantry Regiments Mariassy Nr. 37 and Ignaz Gyulai Nr. 60. General-major Anton Grimmer von Riesenburg's brigade had two battalions each of Infantry Regiments Fröhlich Nr. 28 and Kollowrat Nr. 36. Fresnel's division counted two brigades, each with a foot battery of eight 6-pounders. General-major Philipp Pflüger von Lindenfels's brigade had two battalions each of Infantry Regiments Würzburg Nr. 7 and Archduke Ludwig Nr. 8. General-major Markus von Csollich's brigade had two battalions each of Infantry Regiments Kaiser Nr. 1 and Kottulinsky Nr. 41.

=== Württemberg Order of Battle ===
On 1 January 1814, Field Marshal the Crown Prince of Württemberg's IV Corps comprised an infantry division commanded by Lieutenant General Christian Johann Gottgetreu von Koch and a cavalry division under Lieutenant General Prince Adam von Württemberg, a total of 11,569 troops. General-major Stockmeyer's 1st Brigade consisted of two battalions of King Frederick Jäger Regiment Nr. 9 and one battalion of Light Infantry Regiment Nr. 10. General-major Christoph Friedrich David Döring's 2nd Brigade included two battalions each of Infantry Regiments Duke Wilhelm Nr. 2, Nr. 3 and Nr. 7 plus the 1st Foot Artillery Battery. Prince Karl von Hohenlohe-Kirchberg's 3rd Brigade was made up of two battalions each of Infantry Regiments Nr. 4 and Crown Prince Nr. 6 and the 2nd Foot Battery. General-major Walsleben's cavalry brigade had four squadrons each of Duke Louis Jäger Cavalry Regiment Nr. 2 and Crown Prince Dragoon Regiment Nr. 3 and the 1st Horse Artillery Battery. General-major Jett's cavalry brigade had four squadrons of Prince Adam Jäger Cavalry Regiment Nr. 4 and the 2nd Horse Battery. Each battery was armed with four 6-pound cannons and two howitzers. Between 1 January and 13 March, Jäger Cavalry Regiment Nr. 5, Prince Friedrich Infantry Regiment Nr. 5 and Land Regiments (militia) Nrs. 3–6 joined the corps.
