= Siege of Hamelin =

1806 Siege during the War of the Fourth Coalition

- Part of The War of the Fourth Coalition
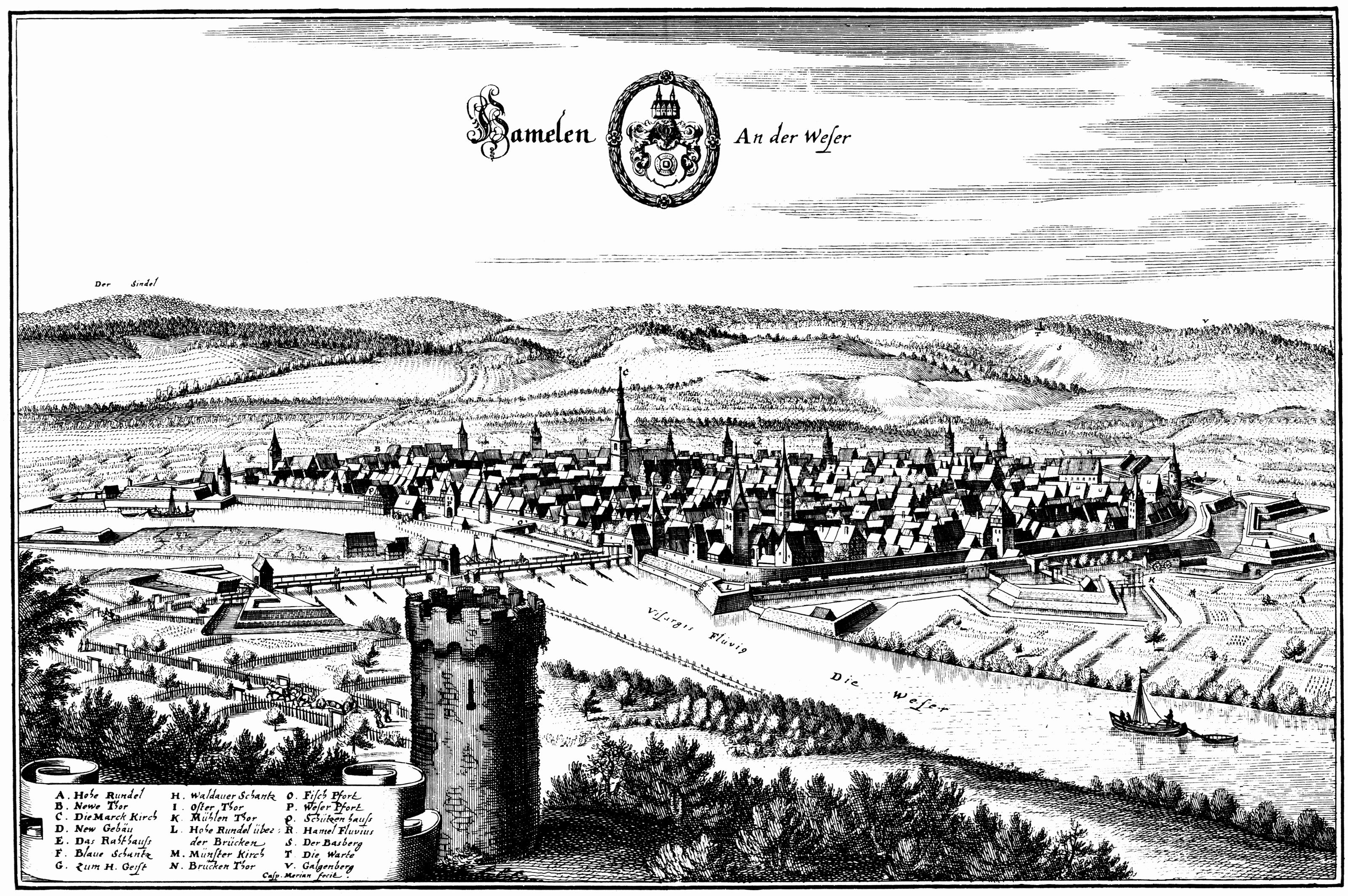
- Hamelin, showing the town's defences in 1654
Date	7 to 22 November 1806
Location	Hamelin, 36 km southwest of Hanover 52°6′N 9°22′E
Result	Franco-Dutch victory

Belligerents
(France) French Empire (Netherlands) Kingdom of Holland	Kingdom of Prussia

Commanders and leaders
(France) Édouard Mortier (France) Jean Savary (Netherlands) Jean Dumonceau	(Kingdom of Prussia) Karl von Lecoq

Units involved
VIII Corps	Garrison of Hamelin

Strength
6,000; 12 cannons	10,000; 175 cannons

Casualties and losses
Minor	600 captured de facto 10,000 capitulated (9,400 escaped); 175 guns

War of the Fourth Coalition
⬤ current battle
⬤ Napoleon not in command
⬤ Napoleon in command

In the siege of Hamelin or siege of Hameln (7 November 1806–22 November 1806), First French Empire forces captured the fortress of Hamelin from its garrison composed of troops from the Kingdom of Prussia. The siege was begun by the VIII Corps under French Marshal Édouard Adolphe Casimir Joseph Mortier. The marshal initially left General of Division Jean-Baptiste Dumonceau in charge of operations. General of Division Anne Jean Marie René Savary soon arrived to conduct negotiations with the Prussian commander General Karl Ludwig von Lecoq, who was quickly persuaded to surrender. Technically, the operation from the War of the Fourth Coalition was a blockade because a formal siege never took place. Hamelin is located 36 kilometers southwest of Hanover.

After Emperor Napoleon I smashed the main Prussian armies at the Battle of Jena-Auerstedt on 14 October, his victorious Grande Armée chased his enemies across the Elbe River. This left the Prussian force defending the former Electorate of Hanover strategically isolated west of the river. While the Grande Armée hunted down Prussian forces between the Elbe and the Oder River, subsidiary forces invaded Hanover and Hesse-Kassel. The defenders withdrew into the fortresses of Hamelin and Nienburg where they were blockaded and captured.

== Background ==
In September 1806, when King Frederick William III mobilized the Prussian armies, a substantial force assembled in or near the former Electorate of Hanover. Lieutenant General Gebhard von Blücher concentrated 16 battalions of infantry and 17 squadrons of cavalry to the west at Paderborn, Osnabrück, Leer, and Oldenburg. In Hanover proper were 20 battalions and 28 squadrons at Celle, Hildesheim, and Braunschweig. This body became the westernmost field army and its 30,000 troops were placed under the command of General of Infantry Ernst von Rüchel and Blücher.

The Prussian high command understood that Napoleon's major thrust must come from the south, so the western field army marched toward Erfurt at the beginning of October. General-Major Christian Alexander von Hagken and General-Major Karl Friedrich von Brüsewitz were left behind to defend against a French offensive from the Kingdom of Holland and the lower Rhine. Taken together with the garrisons of Hamelin and Nienburg, the entire Prussian strength in the area numbered about 12,000 soldiers. The small mobile forces were assembled near Münster and placed under the command of General Karl Ludwig von Lecoq. Opposing the Prussians were King Louis Bonaparte in Holland and Marshal Édouard Adolphe Casimir Joseph Mortier at Mainz. Louis deployed a 5,000 to 6,000-man division near Wesel and another similar-sized division at Utrecht, while Wesel itself was well-defended. Napoleon planned to hold Louis and Mortier in place until he defeated the Prussian main army, at which time they would seize Hesse-Kassel and Hanover.

== Operations ==
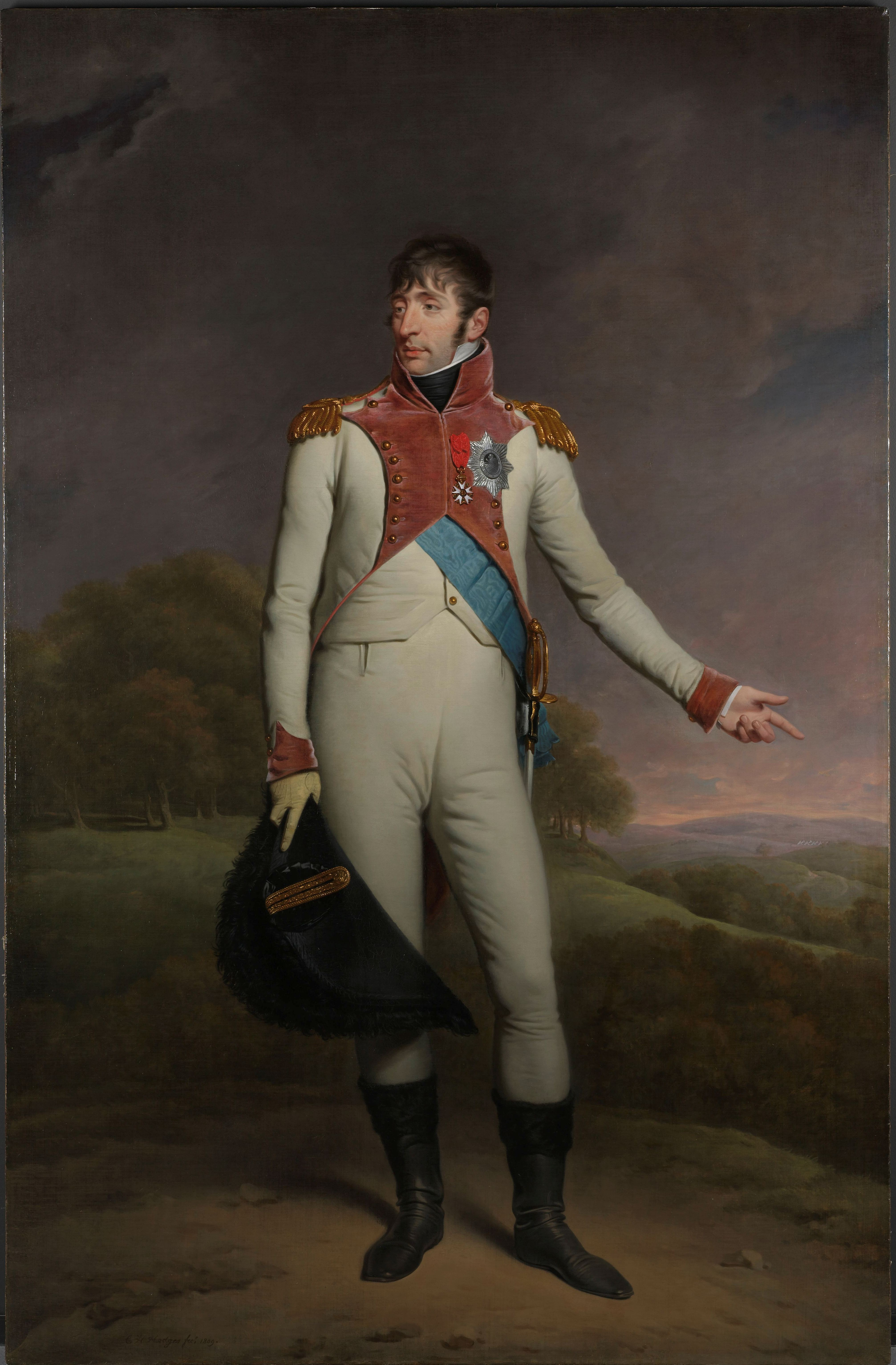
Portrait of Louis Bonaparte by Charles Howard Hodges, 1809

On 9 October, Lecoq and Hagken began advancing west in separate columns. The march was slow and on 19 October, the Prussians received news of the catastrophe of Jena-Auerstedt. Lecoq and Hagken immediately fell back on Hamelin, arriving on 23 October. From there, Lecoq set out the next day for the Elbe. Hearing a report that French forces already blocked his path, he halted his march on the 27th and returned to Hamelin where he began acquiring food and supplies to sustain a siege. He sent Oberst (Colonel) Christian Friedrich von der Osten with one dragoon regiment and one infantry battalion across the Elbe, where he joined a part of Blücher's command.

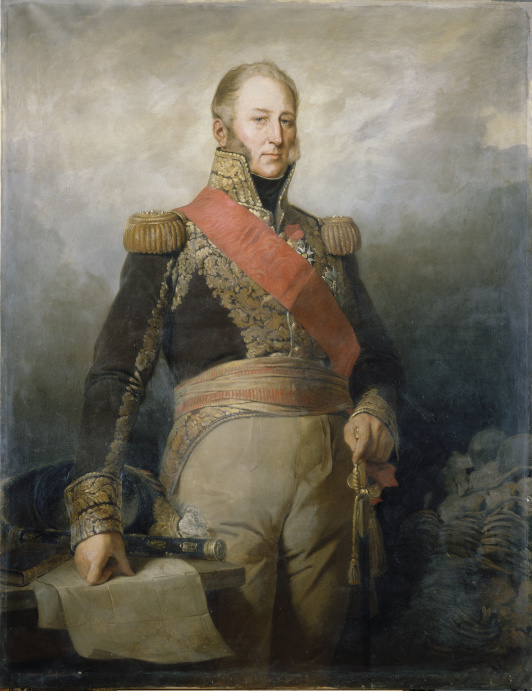
Marshal Édouard Mortier

After hearing of Jena-Auerstedt, General-Major Karl Anton Ernst von Bila left Hanover on 20 October with one battalion, the treasure, and the archives. He managed to get safely across the Elbe but his small force was caught in the French sweep that followed the Capitulation of Stettin. He met his younger brother General-Major Rudolf Ernst Christoph von Bila at Anklam on 31 October, but the next day they and their 2,200 troops surrendered to General of Division Nicolas Léonard Beker's dragoons.

On 17 October, Napoleon dispatched orders to Louis and Mortier. The King of Holland was supposed to capture Paderborn and Münster, while the marshal was to seize Fulda and come into contact with General of Division Henri Jacques Guillaume Clarke at Erfurt. Once, Louis and Mortier were in position, Napoleon wanted them to converge on Kassel where they would extinguish the state of Hesse-Kassel. Though William I, Elector of Hesse maintained an official neutrality, Napoleon knew that he was hostile to France and decided to depose him.

Mortier's command, known as the VIII Corps, included General of Division Louis Henri Loison's infantry division. The 5,500-strong formation was composed of three light infantry regiments. On the morning of 1 November, Mortier's force entered Kassel from the south while Louis' troops arrived from the north soon afterward. The Hessian soldiers were disarmed without resistance and the annexation of Hesse was proclaimed. The Elector and his son escaped. Louis left the army pleading sickness on 9 November and Mortier assumed command of their combined forces. On 7 November the first French troops reached the outskirts of Hamelin, while more arrived on the 10th.

== Siege ==
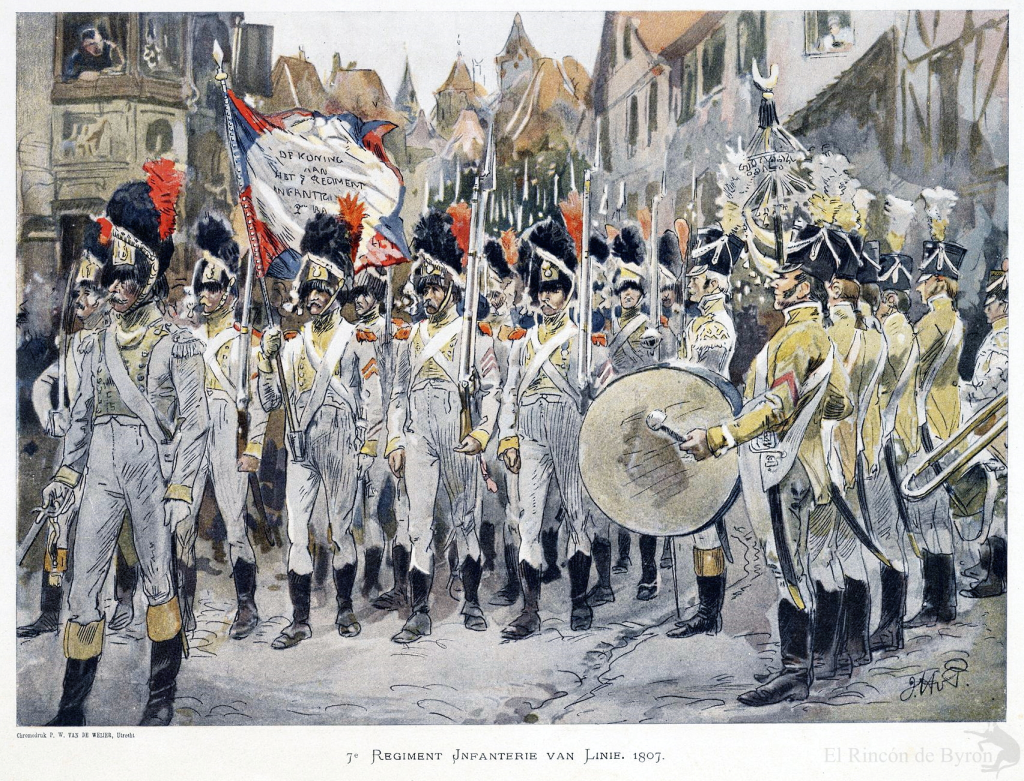
The 7th Line Infantry Regiment of the Kingdom of Holland in Germany, 1807

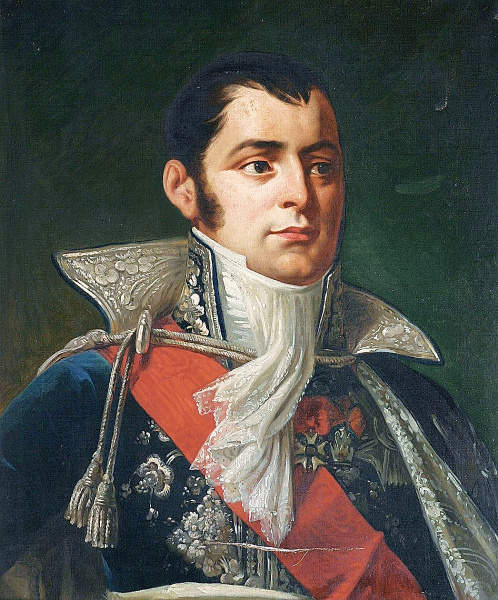
Anne Jean Marie René Savary

Mortier left Dumonceau 6,000 men and 12 cannons to blockade Hamelin, while he continued on toward the city of Hanover, which he seized on 12 November. Dumonceau's Dutch Division was organized into four brigades. General of Brigade Crass led the 1st Brigade, made up of the 1st battalions of the 2nd and 3rd Jäger Regiments. General of Brigade von Heldring commanded the 2nd Brigade, which consisted of two battalions each of the 2nd and 3rd Line Infantry Regiments and one battalion of the 4th Line Infantry Regiment. General of Brigade von Hasselt's 3rd Brigade included two battalions of the 7th Line Infantry Regiment and one battalion of the 8th Line Infantry Regiment. The 3rd Hussar Regiment, four squadrons strong, was the only unit in the 4th Brigade of General of Brigade Mascheck.

Lecoq commanded approximately 10,000 troops and 175 guns in Hamelin. General-Major von Schöler's 3,058-man garrison consisted of the 3rd battalions of the Schenck Infantry Regiment # 9, Tschammer Infantry Regiment # 27, Hagken Infantry Regiment # 44, and Hessen Infantry Regiment # 48. The 75-year-old Schöler also commanded two battalions of the Oranien Infantry Regiment # 19. The remainder of Lecoq's force consisted of four Invalid companies from Schenck, Tschammer, Hagken, and Hessen regiments, 181 gunners, 40 hussars, 1,000 refugees from Jena-Auerstedt, and recruit drafts from the Treuenfels Infantry Regiment # 29 and Strachwitz Infantry Regiment # 43. The fortress had ample stocks of food and munitions.

Mortier applied continuous pressure on Lecoq in order to get him to capitulate, but at first the Prussian refused. Meanwhile, Napoleon was negotiating an armistice with Girolamo Lucchesini, the ambassador of King Frederick William III. One proposal included the surrender of all Prussian fortresses. Though the document had Lucchesini's approval, it was shortly to be rejected by his sovereign. Nevertheless, Napoleon sent Savary to see if he might use the information to induce the Hamelin garrison to surrender. Savary arrived at Hamelin on 19 November and received an audience with Lecoq and his generals. The Frenchman reminded his enemies that there were no Prussian forces within 400 kilometers, then dropped his bombshell, the armistice agreement reached with Lucchesini. Though he outnumbered his adversaries almost two to one, Lecoq consented to capitulate the next day under the same terms as the surrender of Prenzlau. That is, the officers were to be paroled while the rank and file became prisoners of war.

Two differing accounts exist of the surrender, which occurred on 22 November.<In one version, when the Prussian troops found out about the capitulation, they mutinied. The soldiers burst into the wine-shops and soon became drunk. They rioted through the streets, robbing and shooting at the people of Hamelin and one another. The officers demanded that the soldiers be sent home instead of being treated as prisoners of war. In order to enforce the terms of surrender, Savary unleashed his cavalry into the streets. The horsemen herded the Prussian garrison outside the city where they were encircled and disarmed. In the second version, only 600 Prussians were captured. The rest of the garrison, approximately 9,000 men, escaped from Hamelin in the confusion attending the mutiny and scattered into the countryside.

== Result ==
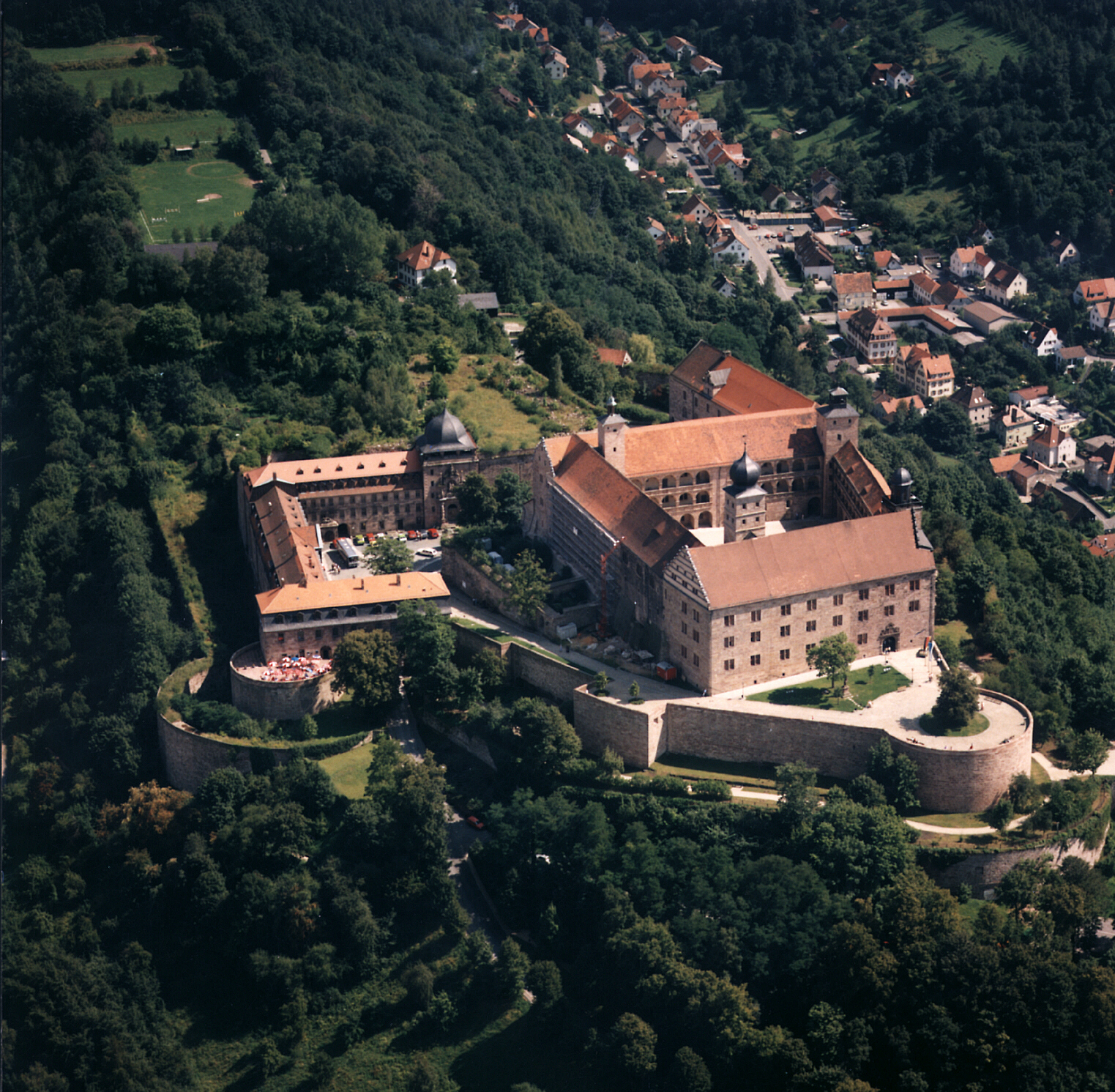
Plassenburg fortress

Leading Dumonceau's division, Savary marched to Nienburg which was already being blockaded by a small force. General-Major von Christian Georg Ludwig Strachwitz commanded a 2,911-man garrison made up of the 3rd battalions of the Wedell Infantry Regiment # 10, Prince Ferdinand Infantry Regiment # 34, and Lettow Infantry Regiment # 41. In addition, there were 168 gunners, 54 hussars, three Invalid companies, and one company of Gravenitz Infantry Regiment # 57. On 26 November, the garrison capitulated. The officers gave their parole while the non-commissioned officers and married men were allowed to go home. The men from Westphalia were marched to Minden and released, while only a handful were sent to France as prisoners.

On 25 November, the impregnable fortress of Plassenburg capitulated without a shot being fired. The place, which is near Hof, was invested by a Bavarian force on 11 October at the beginning of the war. General Mezzanelli's command included the 13th Bavarian Line Infantry Regiment. The day before the surrender, the 13th was relieved by the 6th Line Infantry Regiment. The garrison of 629 fusiliers and men unfit for field duty was under the leadership of General-Major von Johann Adam Siegmund Uttenhoven.

Historian Francis Loraine Petre asserted that it was Lecoq's duty to hold out to the last. His early surrender made it easier for Napoleon to devote resources to the winter campaign in Poland and Eastern Pomerania. Digby Smith called the Hamelin surrender "shameful".

A few days before the final surrenders, on 16 November, Napoleon issued a bulletin. He claimed that of the 145,000 men in the Prussian and Saxon armies, only "the King, the Queen, General Kalckreuth, and 10 or 12 officers are all that escaped." Petre noted that, for once, Napoleon's bulletin was not a wild exaggeration. Hundreds of captured horses would be used to remount the French cavalry. Aside from the enormous losses in men and horses, the Prussians lost 275 field pieces, 236 battalion guns, 12 wagon train columns, and three pontoon trains.

For surrendering Hamelin, Lecoq was sentenced to life imprisonment in December 1809. However, he was allowed to spend most of his confinement in the city of Spandau rather than the fortress prison and was allowed to visit his estate in 1812. From 1813 he was permitted to live in Oranienburg and in 1814 he received a pardon. The talented cartographer continued to make maps until he went blind, and he died in 1829.

== Notes ==
Preceded by Greater Poland uprising (1806)	Napoleonic Wars; Siege of Hamelin	Succeeded by Battle of Czarnowo
