= Jean-Baptiste Dumonceau =

Belgian general (1760–1821)

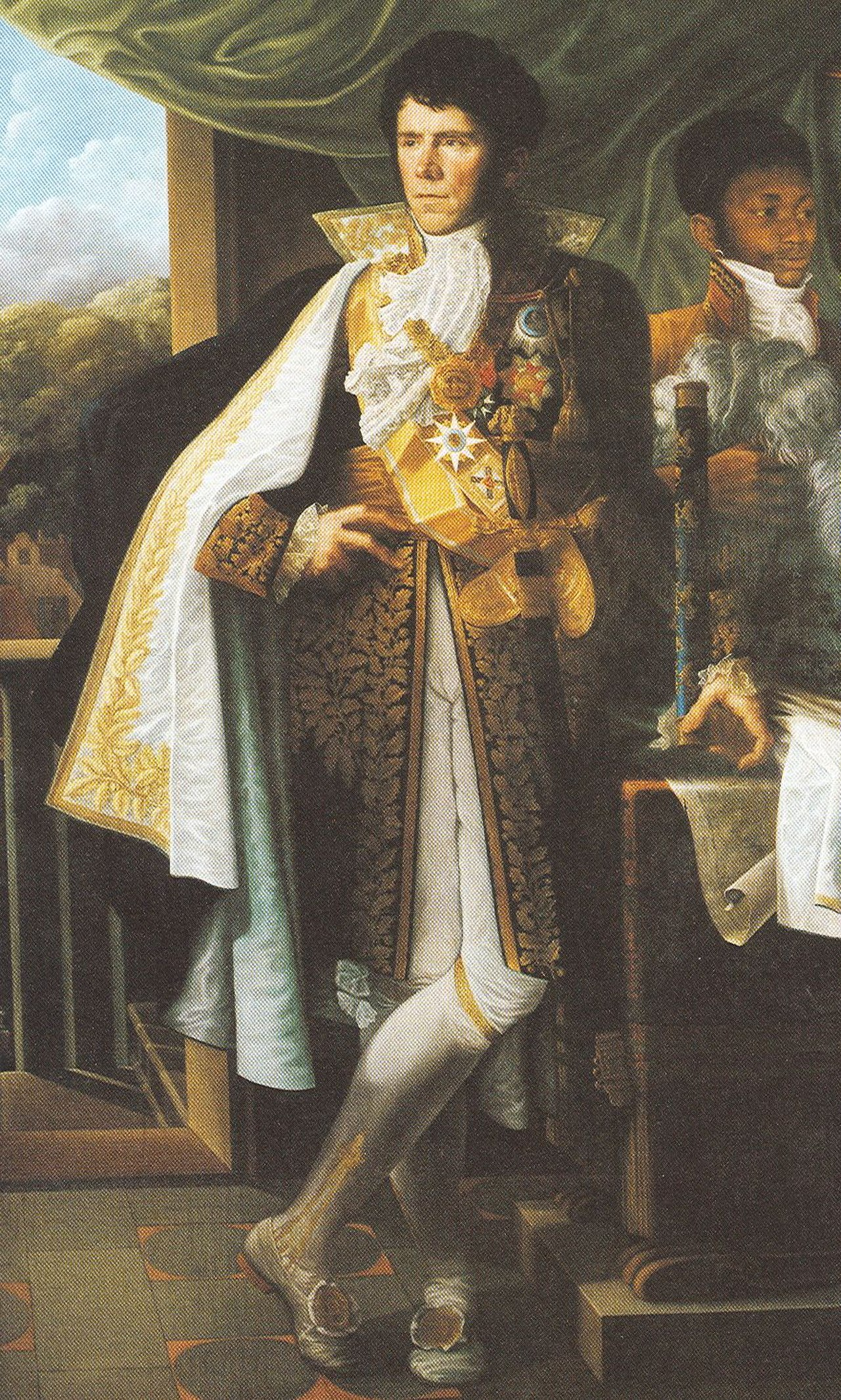
- Born: 7 November 1760; Brussels, Austrian Netherlands (modern Belgium)
- Died: 29 December 1821 (aged 61); Forest, United Kingdom of the Netherlands (modern Belgium)
- Military career
- Allegiance: United Belgian States; First French Republic; Batavian Republic; Kingdom of Holland; First French Empire; United Kingdom of the Netherlands
- Rank: Général de division
- Nicknames: Le général sans tache (The unblemished general)
- Conflicts: Brabant Revolution; War of the First Coalition; Flanders campaign; Battle of Valmy; Battle of Jemappes; Battle of Neerwinden; War of the Second Coalition; Anglo-Russian invasion of Holland; Battle of Krabbendam; Battle of Bergen; War of the Third Coalition; Planned invasion of Britain; War of the Fourth Coalition; Siege of Hamelin; Capture of East Frisia; War of the Fifth Coalition; Walcheren Campaign; French invasion of Russia; War of the Sixth Coalition; Battle of Kulm; Siege of Dresden
- Awards: Marshal of Holland, Name engraved on the Arc de Triomphe, Rue Dumonceau, Bruxelles

Jean-Baptiste Dumonceau de Bergendal (French pronunciation: [ʒɑ̃ batist dymɔ̃so]; 7 November 1760 – 29 December 1821) was a general from the Southern Netherlands, in the service of France and the Netherlands.

== Life ==
At first destined for a career as an architect (for which he showed a marked disposition), he fought in his first battles in 1788 as a volunteer in the Canaris (after its uniform's colour) cavalry regiment during the Brabant Revolution. He became a lieutenant colonel in that unit in November 1789. After the revolution was stopped in 1790, he fled and offered the First French Republic his services, commanding a battalion of the Belgian Legion, fighting at Jemappes and rising to général de brigade in 1793 after his defence of the approaches to Lille against the young comte de Bouillé.

Fighting in the invasion of the Dutch Republic under general Pichegru in 1795, he moved to the Batavian Republic's army as a lieutenant-general. In 1796 he commanding the troops protecting the provinces of Groningen, Friesland and Drenthe, before being made military governor of the Hague. During the Anglo-Russian invasion of Holland he brought up two-thirds of his 2nd Batavian division in forced marches from Friesland and he arrived on 8 September to take on a position in the center of the Franco-Batavian front, around Alkmaar, in time for the Battle of Krabbendam. He was then reinforced with the 7th Half-brigade of Daendels' division. He was wounded at the battle of Bergen (1799) and was thus unable to participate in the Battle of Alkmaar. In 1805 he commanded the corps of Batavian troops placed under the command of maréchal Mortier.

After the Batavian Republic's transformation into the Kingdom of Holland under Louis Bonaparte in 1806, general Dumonceau became a conseiller d'État and marshal of Holland. He regularly commanded Dutch troops in the Napoleonic Wars and on 30 March 1809 was made a naturalised Dutch citizen by king Louis. He was later made count of Bergenduin on 15 April 1810. After Holland's annexation by France in July 1810, Dumonceau was made a comte de l'Empire by Napoleon I of France on 28 January 1811, then count of Bergendal, with the establishment of majorat in département d'Ombrone on 2 May 1811.

He fought in the 1813 campaign under general Vandamme and guaranteed the army's retreat after Vandamme's capture at the battle of Kulm. Dumonceau was then captured himself at Dresden on 11 November 1813 with maréchal Gouvion-Saint-Cyr, remaining a prisoner until Napoleon's abdication in April 1814. He played no role during the Hundred Days. He then returned to the Netherlands and became aide de camp to William I of the Netherlands. he was elected deputy for Brabant-Méridional in the Tweede Kamer from 15 March 1820 until his death in 1821.

== Marriage and issue ==
General Dumonceau married twice. His first marriage was to Anne-Marie Collinet in Brussels on 5 May 1782. After her death on 15 June 1795, he married Agnes Wilhelmina Cremers at Groningen on 22 May 1796. His son Jean-François Dumonceau (1790–1884), his grandson Charles-Henri-Félix (1827–1918) and his great-grandson Charles-Joseph-Henri-Félix Dumonceau (1859–1952) were all aides de camp to William III then Wilhelmina. A Comte du Monceau was also co-regent of the Kingdom of the Netherlands before the majority of Queen Wilhelmina.

== Namesakes ==
- In Brussels:
  - rue Dumonceau
  - avenue général Dumonceau

== Sources ==
- Jean Tulard (ed.), Dictionnaire Napoléon, Fayard, 1999
- Biography – Archives nationales des Pays-Bas
- Parlement.com
- Blok, P.J.; Molhuysen, P.C. (1911). "Dumonceau, Joannes Baptista". Nieuw Nederlandsch Biografisch Woordenboek (NNBW). Deel 1.
