= Édouard Mortier, Duke of Treviso =

French military officer and diplomat (1768–1835)

Marshal of the Empire Édouard Mortier Duke of Treviso
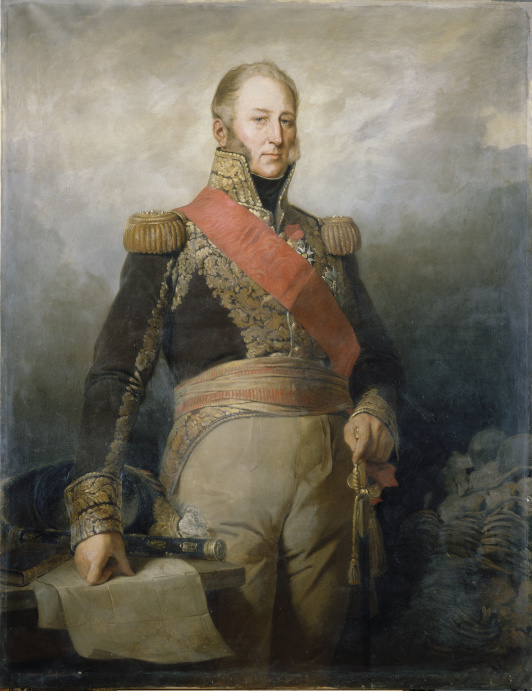
- Portrait by Édouard Dubufe, 1844

Prime Minister of France
- In office 18 November 1834 – 12 March 1835
- Monarch: Louis Philippe I
- Preceded by: Hugues-Bernard Maret
- Succeeded by: Victor de Broglie

Minister of War
- In office 18 November 1834 – 12 March 1835
- Preceded by: Simon Bernard
- Succeeded by: Henri de Rigny

Personal details
- Born: 13 February 1768 Le Cateau, Kingdom of France
- Died: 28 July 1835 (aged 67) Paris, France
- Resting place: Père Lachaise Cemetery
- Awards: Grand Cordon of the Legion of Honor; Grand Cross of the Military Order of Jesus Christ

Military service
- Allegiance: France
- Branch/service: Army
- Years of service: 1791–1835
- Rank: General of division
- Commands: VIII Corps; V Corps
- Battles/wars: See battles: French Revolutionary Wars; War of the First Coalition; War of the Second Coalition; Second Battle of Zurich; Battle of Muottental; Napoleonic Wars; War of the Third Coalition; Battle of Ulm; Battle of Dürenstein; Battle of Austerlitz; Franco-Swedish War; Siege of Stralsund; Siege of Kolberg; War of the Fourth Coalition; Battle of Jena; Battle of Friedland; Peninsular War; Battle of Samosierra; Siege of Zaragoza; Battle of Ocaña; Siege of Badajoz; French Invasion of Russia; Battle of Borodino; Battle of Berezina; War of the Sixth Coalition; Battle of Lützen; Battle of Bautzen; Battle of Reichenbach; Battle of Dresden; Battle of Leipzig; First Battle of Bar-sur-Aube; Battle of Montmirail; Battle of Gué-à-Tresmes; Battle of Craonne; Battle of Laon; Battle of Paris; Hundred Days; Battle of Waterloo

Édouard Adolphe Casimir Joseph Mortier, Duke of Treviso (English: /mɔːrˈtiːeɪ/ mor-TEE-ay, French: [adɔlf edwaʁ kazimiʁ ʒozɛf mɔʁtje]; 13 February 1768 – 28 July 1835), was a French military commander and Marshal of the Empire under Napoleon I, who served during the French Revolutionary Wars and the Napoleonic Wars. He served as Minister of War and Prime Minister of France from 1834 to 1835. He was one of 18 people killed in 1835 during Giuseppe Marco Fieschi's assassination attempt on King Louis Philippe I.

== Early life ==
Mortier was born at Le Cateau (now Le Cateau-Cambrésis), northern France, on 13 February 1768. He was the son of Charles Mortier (1730–1808), a draper, and his wife Marie Anne Joseph Bonnaire (born 1735). After studying at the Irish College, Douai, he joined the National Guard of Dunkirk in 1789, at the start of the French Revolution, and was elected captain of a unit of volunteers in September 1791.

== French Revolutionary Wars ==
Upon the outbreak of the War of the First Coalition in 1792, Mortier was assigned to the Army of the North. He spent the next years serving in the Low Countries theatre, fighting at the Battle of Jemappes and the Siege of Namur, in 1792, at the Battle of Neerwinden in 1793, and at the Battle of Fleurus in 1794. He was then transferred to the Army of Sambre and Meuse on the Rhine, and distinguished himself in the capture of Maastricht. Mortier was tasked by General Jacques Maurice Hatry to negotiate the surrender of the Fortress of Mainz, which he completed successfully and then returned to Paris.

During the War of the Second Coalition in 1799, Mortier was promoted to brigade general and served under General Soult at the Second Battle of Zurich in September 1799, where he led a force of 8,000 in the attack from Dieticon on Zurich. He was made a general of division in October and recalled to Paris in early 1800.

== Napoleonic Wars ==
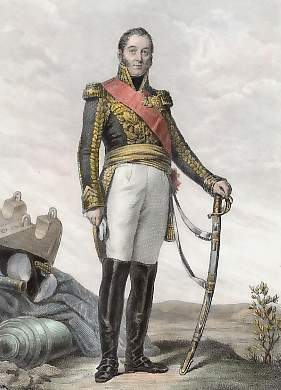
Portrait of Mortier as a Marshal of the Empire

In 1803, Mortier was appointed commander-in-chief of an invasion of the Electorate of Hanover by First Consul Napoleon Bonaparte. His successful occupation of Hanover, bringing about the Convention of Artlenburg, led Napoleon to include Mortier in the first list of marshals created in 1804. In 1805, Mortier was made commander of the infantry of the Imperial Guard.

During the War of the Third Coalition, Mortier commanded a corps of the Grande Armée in the Ulm campaign in which he distinguished himself. In the campaign of the middle Danube, which culminated in the Battle of Austerlitz, Napoleon placed him in command of the newly formed VIII Corps, composed of divisions from the other corps. Mortier over-extended his line of march on the north shore of the Danube and failed to heed Napoleon's advice to protect his north flank. A combined Russo-Austrian force, under the command of General Mikhail Kutuzov enticed Mortier to send General Théodore Maxime Gazan's 2nd Division into a trap and French troops were caught in a valley between two Russian columns. They were rescued by the timely arrival of a second division, under command of General Pierre Dupont de l'Étang's 1st Division, which covered a day's march in a half-day. The Battle of Dürrenstein (11 November 1805) extended well into the night. Both sides claimed victory, with the French losing more than a third of the participants, and Gazan's division experiencing over 40 percent losses. The Austrians and Russians also suffered heavy losses—close to 16 percent. After Austerlitz, Napoleon dispersed the corps and Gazan received the Legion of Honour, but Mortier was simply reassigned to command the V Corps.

When the War of the Fourth Coalition broke out in 1806, Napoleon ordered Mortier to assume command of the reformed VIII Corps on 1 October. He was to coordinate his operations with Louis Bonaparte's Franco-Dutch troops. On 16 October, two days after his crushing victory over Prussia at Jena-Auerstedt, Napoleon ordered Mortier and Louis to conquer the Electorate of Hesse. Mortier was to occupy Fulda and then the capital city of Kassel, rule as military governor, and imprison the Elector of Hesse, William I. Every Hessian officer above the rank of lieutenant would be arrested and Napoleon stated his intention to "wipe the house of Hesse-Kassel from the map". Mortier knew this constituted a violation of Hessian neutrality and boasted on 17 October that its very neutrality made it easy to conquer. On 1 November, the French occupied and looted Kassel, discovering that William had fled. Mortier issued a proclamation in which he claimed to have come to avenge Prussian violation of Hessian neutrality but also accused them of being Prussian allies.

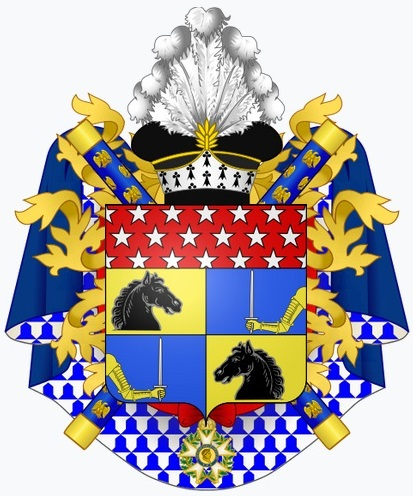
Heraldic achievement of Adolphe-Édouard-Casimir-Joseph Mortier, Duke of Treviso

Mortier left a division to hold Hesse-Kassel while the rest of his corps was directed to mopping-up operations in Prussia. Hamelin capitulated on 22 November, along with a garrison of 10,000 Prussian troops. Nienburg fell on 29 November, with 2,911 Prussian soldiers marching into captivity. In 1807, he led the left wing of Napoleon's army at Battle of Friedland, and served at the sieges of Stralsund and Kolberg. In 1808, Napoleon rewarded Mortier for his actions at Friedland with the title of "Duke of Treviso" (Duc de Trévise in French), a duché grand-fief (a rare, but nominal, hereditary honor, extinguished in 1946) in his own Kingdom of Italy.

In October 1808, Mortier was sent to Spain in the campaign for the recapture of Madrid, at the head of the V Corps, which he led at the Battle of Somosierra and the Second Siege of Zaragoza. He then fought under Marshal Soult at the Arzobispo, in August 1809, and contributed to the victory at Ocaña, where he was wounded. Afterwards Mortier served in southern Spain, most notably at the Siege of Badajoz, before being recalled to France in May 1811.

During the invasion of Russia in 1812, Mortier commanded the Young Guard. After the Battle of Borodino he became governor of French-occupied Moscow, and was ordered to destroy what remained of the city when the retreat began. He then fought at Krasnoi, at the Berezina, and regrouped the surviving Imperial Guards in January 1813. Mortier again commanded the Young Guard in several battles of the German campaign, including Lützen, Bautzen, Dresden and Leipzig. During the defense of France in 1814, he rendered brilliant services in command of rearguards and covering detachments, and led the Old Guard at Montmirail, Craonne, Laon, and at the final Battle of Paris.

He rallied to the Bourbon Restoration after Napoleon's abdication in April 1814. In 1815, during Napoleon's return to power in the Hundred Days, Mortier escorted the king out of the country before joining the emperor in Paris. He was given command of the Imperial Guard once more, but at the opening of the Waterloo campaign, he was unable to continue due to severe sciatica.

== Post-war career ==
Following the second Bourbon Restoration, Mortier reluctanctly agreed to be part of the court martial trying Marshal Michel Ney. After the court declared itself incompetent he was for a time in disgrace, but in January 1816 he received a command, and in 1819 Mortier was readmitted to the Chamber of Peers and in 1825 received the Order of the Holy Spirit, the kingdom's highest honor. He supported the July Revolution that brought King Louis Philippe to power in 1830. From 1830 to 1831 he was the Ambassador of France to Russia at St. Petersburg, and from 1834 to 1834, Minister of War and President of the Council of Ministers.

=== Death ===
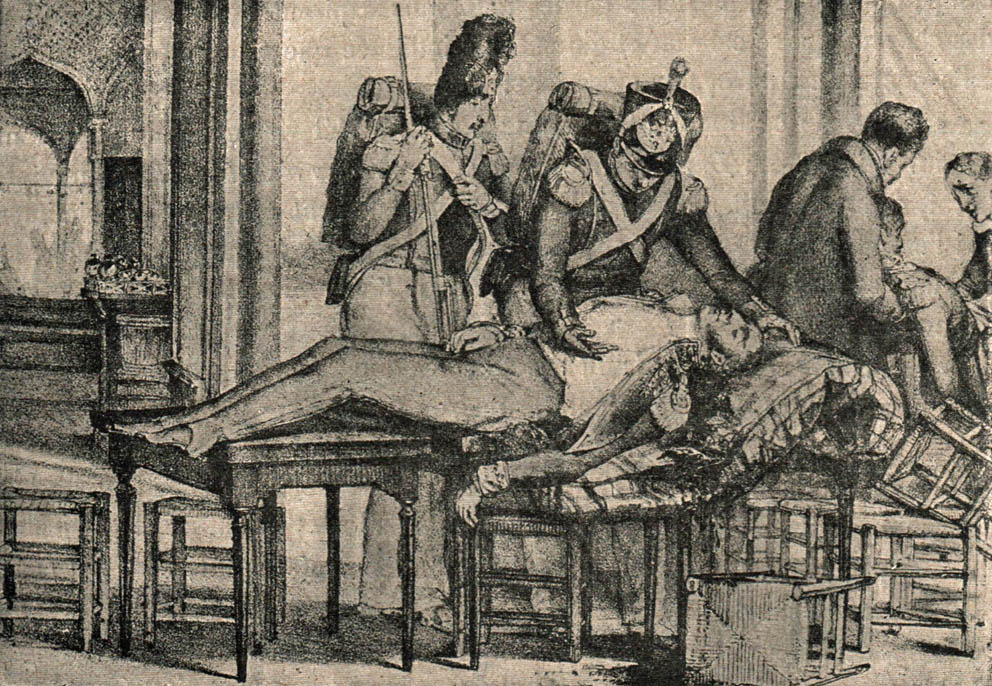
Death of Marshal Mortier in a contemporary print

On 28 July 1835, Mortier was one of those accompanying King Louis-Philippe to a review of the Paris National Guard, an annual event that commemorated the July Revolution that brought the king to power in 1830. In the Boulevard du Temple, the royal party was hit by a volley of gunfire from the upstairs window of a house. Eighteen were killed, including Mortier, and 22 injured. The king received only a minor wound.

The weapon used was a home-made volley gun, constructed and fired by Giuseppe Marco Fieschi for the purpose of assassinating the king. Fieschi had fixed twenty-five musket barrels to a wooden frame, and arranged that they could be fired simultaneously. Four of the barrels burst when fired and Fieschi was badly wounded. He was quickly captured and later tried with two co-conspirators. The three went to the guillotine in February 1836.

== Family ==
Mortier married Eve Anne Hymmès (Coblence, 19 August 1779 – Paris, 13 February 1855), by whom he had six children:

- Caroline Mortier de Trevise (1800–1842): married to Marie-Hippolyte de Gueulluy, 2nd Marquess of Rumigny.
  - Marie-Louise de Gueulluy de Rumigny x Ludovic-Marie, Count d'Ursel,
    (1809–1886)
    - Hippolyte, count d'Ursel (1850–1937)
- Sophie Malvina Joséphine Mortier de Trévise (b. 1803)
- Napoléon Mortier de Trévise (1804–1869), 2nd Duke of Trévise
- Edouard (1806–1815)
- Louise (1811–1831)
- Eve-Stéphanie Mortier de Trévise (1814–1831), countess Gudin

== Bibliography ==
- A. Bouveiron; Giuseppe Marco Fieschi (1835). An historical and biographical sketch of Fieschi. Sold at the office of the editor. p. 32.
- Harsin, Jill (2002). Barricades:The War of the Streets in Revolutionary Paris,1830–1848. Palgrave Macmillan. ISBN 0-312-29479-4.
- Gray, Randal (1987). Napoleon's Marshals. New York: Macmillan.

Political offices
Preceded by Hugues Maret	Prime Minister of France; 1834–1835	Succeeded by Victor de Broglie
Preceded by Simon Bernard	French Minister of War; 1834–1835	Succeeded by Henri de Rigny
Military offices
Preceded by François Joseph Lefebvre	Military governor of Paris; 1800–1803	Succeeded by Jean-Andoche Junot
