= Hohenlohe (disambiguation) =

Hohenlohe is a German princely family and a district in Baden-Württemberg, Germany.

Historical states named Hohenlohe include:

- Hohenlohe-Bartenstein
- Hohenlohe-Ingelfingen
- Hohenlohe-Jagstberg
- Hohenlohe-Langenburg
- Hohenlohe-Neuenstein
- Hohenlohe-Öhringen
- Hohenlohe-Schillingsfürst
- Hohenlohe-Uffenheim-Speckfeld
- Hohenlohe-Waldenburg
- Hohenlohe-Weikersheim

== People with the surname ==
- Heinrich von Hohenlohe, 13th century Grand Master of the Teutonic Knights
- Gottfried von Hohenlohe, 14th century Grand Master of the Teutonic Knights
- Frederick Louis, Prince of Hohenlohe-Ingelfingen (1746-1818), Prussian general
- Louis Aloy de Hohenlohe-Waldenburg-Bartenstein (1765–1829), marshal and peer of France
- Prince Alexander of Hohenlohe-Waldenburg-Schillingsfürst (1794-1849), priest
- Adolf zu Hohenlohe-Ingelfingen (1797–1873), soldier, prime minister
- Gustav Adolf Hohenlohe (1823-1896), cardinal
- Kraft, Prinz zu Hohenlohe-Ingelfingen (1827–1892), Prussian general and writer
- Prince Chlodwig zu Hohenlohe-Schillingsfürst (1819–1901), Chancellor of Germany
- Stephanie von Hohenlohe (1891-1972), socialite and spy
- Prince Alfonso of Hohenlohe-Langenburg (1924–2003), Spanish businessman
- Christoph von Hohenlohe (1956-2006), socialite
- Hubertus von Hohenlohe (born 1959), Alpine skier

== Other uses ==
- Hohenloh, a suburb of Detmold
- Hohenlohe, a historic village in Kitzen
- Hohenlohe Island (Остров гогенлоэ), an island in Franz Josef Land, Russia, was named after this dynasty by the Austro-Hungarian North Pole Expedition.
- Hohenlohe Regiment, a regiment of Swiss and German soldiers serving in the French Army between 1815 and 1831.
