= Prince Hohenlohe =

Prince Hohenlohe may refer to:

- Prince Chlodwig zu Hohenlohe-Schillingsfürst (1819–1901), Imperial Chancellor under William II
- Frederick Louis, Prince of Hohenlohe-Ingelfingen (1746–1818), commander at Jena

== See also ==
- Hohenlohe (disambiguation)
