= Ingelfingen =

- Town
- Coat of arms

- Location of Ingelfingen within Hohenlohekreis district
- Interactive map of Ingelfingen
- Location within Germany Location within Baden-Württemberg
- Coordinates: 49°18′N 9°39′E
- Country: Germany
- State: Baden-Württemberg
- Admin. region: Stuttgart
- District: Hohenlohekreis
- Subdivisions: 8

Government
  - Mayor (2022–30): Michael Bauer

Area
  - Total: 46.48 km^{2} (17.95 sq mi)
- Elevation: 217 m (712 ft)

Population (2025-12-31)
  - Total: 5,468
  - Density: 117.6/km^{2} (304.7/sq mi)
- Time zone: UTC+01:00 (CET)
  - Summer (DST): UTC+02:00 (CEST)
- Postal codes: 74653
- Dialling codes: 07940
- Vehicle registration: KÜN, ÖHR
- Website: www.ingelfingen.de

Ingelfingen (German pronunciation: [ˈɪŋəlfɪŋən]) is a town in the Hohenlohe district, in Baden-Württemberg, Germany. It is situated on the river Kocher, 4 km northwest of Künzelsau, and 36 km northeast of Heilbronn.

== History ==
Numerous archeological findings from the Hallstatt culture, the La Tène culture and the late Stone Age show that the area has been inhabited since at least 5000 years with interruptions. The first permanent settlement has been documented in a document from 1080 of the Comburg monastery and later in 1248 in a letter by Pope Innocent IV. In 1323, the city officially acquired the rights of a "market town". During the 30 years' war, the city suffered from heavy damages.

Under the Hohenlohe Dynasty, Count Graf Christian Kraft of Hohenlohe moved into Ingelfingen in 1701 and built a residence today known as "Neues Schloss" (lit. 'New Castle'). As a result of this, the village experienced heavy growth.

The last noblemen residing in Ingelfingen was Friedrich Ludwig who built the "Mariannenvorstadt", an industrial suburb. As a general, he was defeated by Napoleon at the Battle of Jena–Auerstedt in 1806.

In 1972/73, six neighboring villages were incorporated into Ingelfingen and since then function as boroughs of the town (Ortsteile).

=== Criesbach ===
A village originating in the early Middle Ages, Criesbach—in early mentions in the 11th and 12th century as "Criegesbach"—belonged to Comburg. Notably, it was in a heavy dispute over land use with the neighboring village of Ingelfingen in the late 16th century. In 1790, the village that relied on agriculture and viticulture, had a population of around 330. Today, 618 inhabitants live on an area of 352 hectares.

=== Diebach ===
First documented in 1326 as Dybach, the village then consisted of two settlements, Lower-Diebach and Upper-Diebach, the latter being abandoned before 1703. In that year, the population of the Lower was counted 110. The church of Saint Joseph was built in 1716/17. Today, Diebach has a population of 297 on 277 hectares.

=== Dörrenzimmern ===
The history of Dörrenzimmern dates back more than a thousand years, to the 7th or 8th century. Historically, the village had two cores that eventually grew together. Until at least 1671, Oberzimmern and Unterzimmern were differentiated. In 1790, around 185 people lived in 42 houses. In the 18th century, it was known as a rather wealthy village. Today, 426 inhabitants live on 539 hectares.

=== Eberstal ===
Eberstal was probably created in the early middle ages, around the end of the 11th century. In the 13th century, the village belonged to the noblemen of Krautheim, in 1365 to the counts of Eberstein and later to Mainz and then to Württemberg.

At the end of the 17th century, Eberstal had a population of 330 which decreased to around 240 by 1775 and reached its old number in the 19th century again. Today, the there are 389 inhabitants, and it has an area of 597 hectares.

=== Hermuthausen ===
Hermutshausen originated in the early middle ages, possibly being the "villa Herimitteshusen" that was mentioned in the Codex Eberhardi (Fulda) in the 9th century. The village belonged to the noblemen of Krautheim for a long time. In 1790, the village had a population of 250. Today that number has slightly risen to 299. The area of Hermutshausen is 650 hectares.

=== Stachenhausen ===
Stachenhausen is one of the smallest boroughs of Ingelfingen. It was first documented in 1257 as Stuchenhusin and had a population of around 70 - 80 in 1790. Today, the village has a population of 220 and an area of 489 hectares.

=== Weldingsfelden ===
Weldingsfelden originated in the early middle ages and was first historically mentioned in a document of 1310 as Waeltingesvelden. Around 1500, the village consisted of around 17 Peasant estates. In the middle of the 18th century, there were 25 houses. There were several smaller hamlets around the village, such as Untereschach and Obereschach in the 16th century, Velenweiler around 1304 and Eschenhof which is the only one that did not go extinct.

In 1790, Weldingsfelden had a population of around 120. Today that number has more than doubled to 269. The area of the village is 563 hectares.

== Twin towns ==
Ingelfingen is twinned with:

- Saint-Héand, France, since 1991

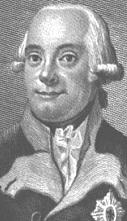
Frederick Louis, Prince of Hohenlohe-Ingelfingen

== Notable people ==
- David Chytraeus (1530–1600), Lutheran theologian, reformer and historian.
- Friedrich Ludwig, Prince of Hohenlohe-Ingelfingen (1747-1818), Prussian general and Hohenlohe prince.
- Johann Gottfried Eichhorn (1752–1827), a Protestant theologian of the Age of Enlightenment.
- Friedrich Karl Wilhelm, Fürst zu Hohenlohe (1752-1815), Field Marshal Lieutenant, Prince of Hohenlohe-Ingelfingen
- brothers August Gemünder (1814–1895) & George Gemünder (1816-1899), American violin makers.
