= Prince Adolf of Hohenlohe-Ingelfingen =

Prussian prince (1797–1873)

Adolf Karl
- Prinz zu Hohenlohe-Ingelfingen
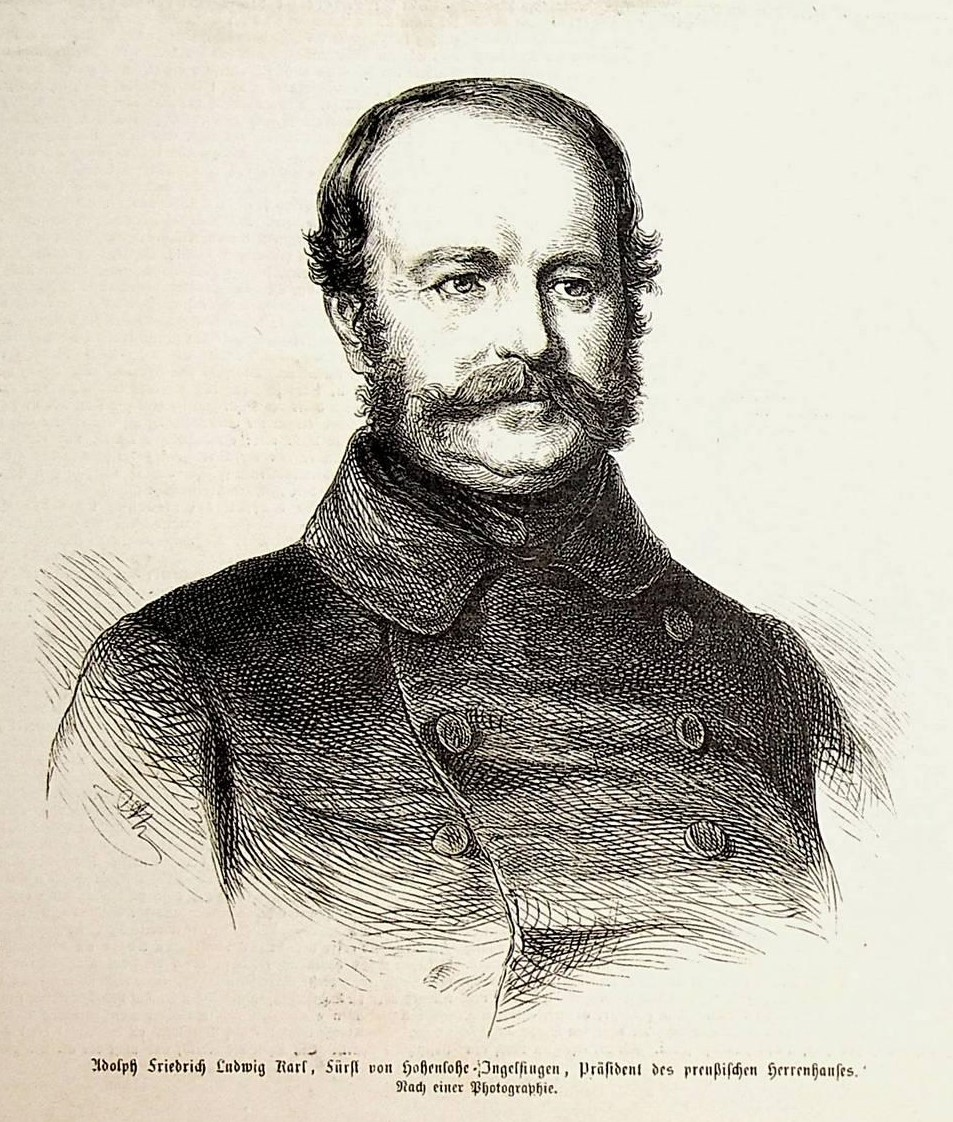
- Full name: Adolf Karl Friedrich Ludwig
- Born: 29 January 1797; Breslau, Prussia
- Died: 24 April 1873 (aged 76); Koschentin, Prussia
- Noble family: Hohenlohe-Ingelfingen
- Father: Frederick Louis
- Mother: Maria Amalie
- Occupation: Politician

Minister President of Prussia
- In office 17 March 1862 – 23 September 1862
- Monarch: William I
- Preceded by: Karl Anton
- Succeeded by: Otto von Bismarck

Military service
- Allegiance: Prussia
- Branch/service: Prussian Army

Adolf Karl Friedrich Ludwig Prinz zu Hohenlohe-Ingelfingen (29 January 1797 – 24 April 1873) was a Prussian nobleman, soldier, and politician. He briefly served as Minister-President of Prussia in 1862 and was succeeded by Otto von Bismarck. Between 1829 and 1830, he rebuilt Koszęcin palace in neoclassical style and it became his residence as well as for his descendants.

== Marriage and issue ==
On 19 April 1819, Prince Adolf married Princess Louise of Hohenlohe-Langenburg (22 August 1799 – 17 January 1881), daughter of Prince Karl Ludwig of Hohenlohe-Langenburg. They had the following children:

- Carl (19 November 1820 – 1 May 1890)
- Friedrich Wilhelm (9 January 1826 – 24 October 1895)
- Kraft (2 January 1827 – 16 January 1892)
- Adelheid (13 May 1830 – 15 February 1892)
- Luise "Lisi" (25 March 1835 – 15 July 1913)

== See ==
- Hohenlohe-Ingelfingen cabinet

Adolf Karl, Prince of Hohenlohe-Ingelfingen House of Hohenlohe-Ingelfingen Born: 29 January 1797 Died: 24 April 1873
Political offices
Preceded by Karl Anton	Minister President of Prussia; 17 March 1862 – 23 September 1862	Succeeded by Otto von Bismarck
