= Śląsk Song and Dance Ensemble =

Song and dance ensemble

- Polski zespōł norodowy śpiywki i tańca "Śląsk" na pamiyńć Stanisława Hadyny
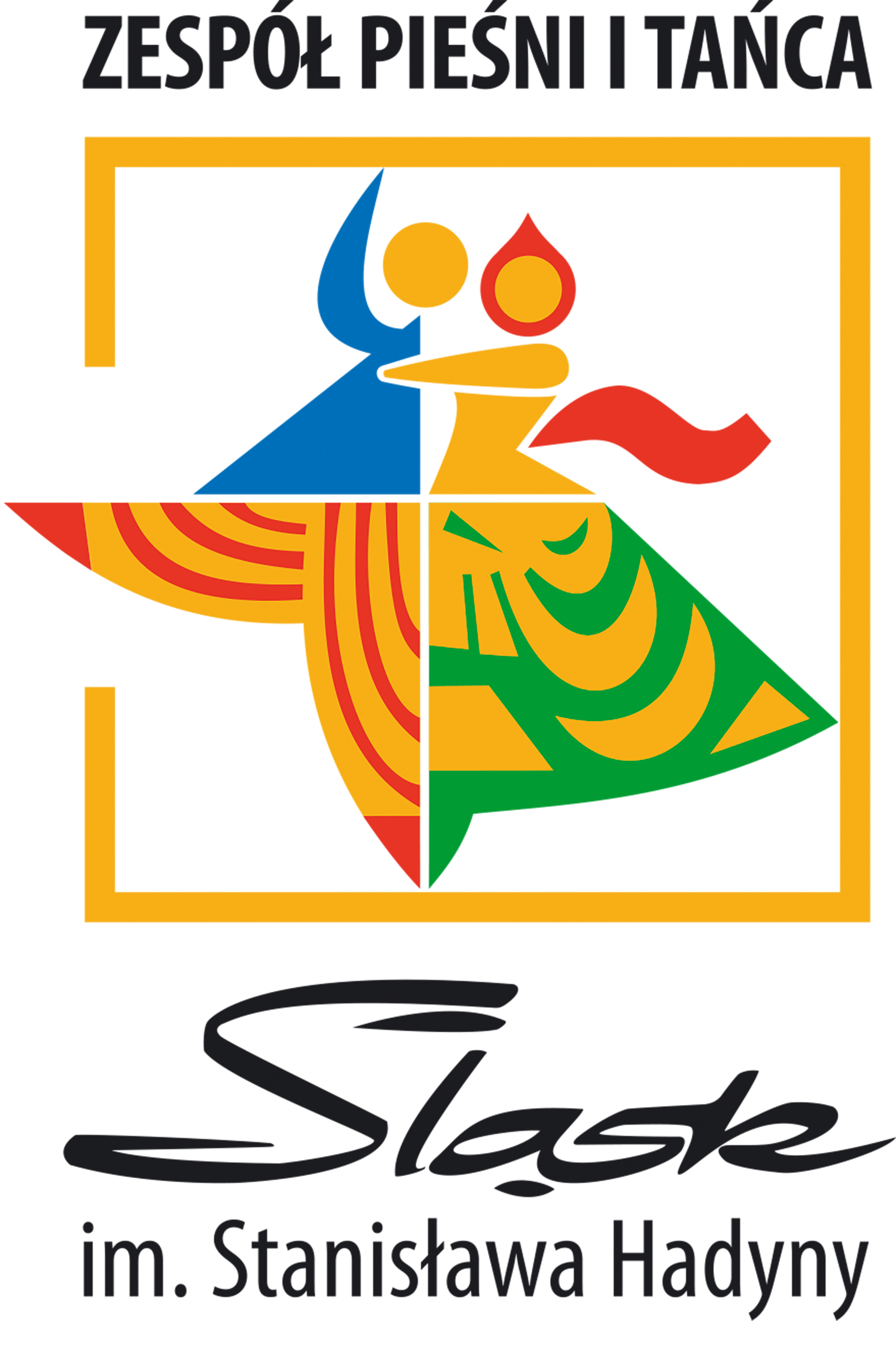

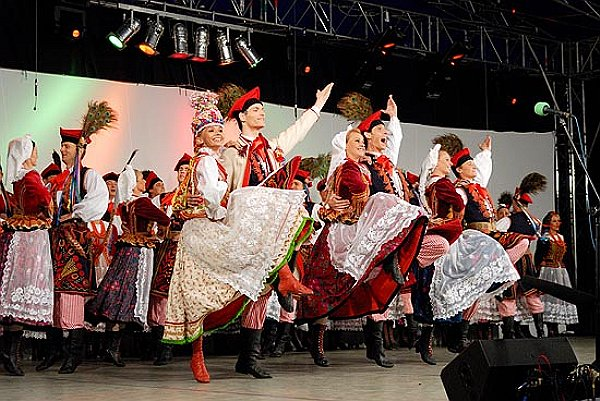
- Performance during Święta "Śląska"
- Formation: July 1, 1953
- Type: Dance ensemble
- Purpose: Folk
- Location: Koszęcin, Silesia
- Artistic director: Jarosław Świątek
- Website: zespolslask.pl

The Śląsk Song and Dance Ensemble (full name: Polish National Song and Dance Ensemble "Śląsk" in memory of Stanisław Hadyna, in Polish: Zespół Pieśni i Tańca "Śląsk" im. Stanisława Hadyny; Silesian: Polski zespōł norodowy śpiywki i tańca "Śląsk" na pamiyńć Stanisława Hadyny) is one of the largest Polish folk ensembles. It was founded on 1 July 1953 by Stanisław Hadyna and is named after the Silesia (Śląsk) region. It is based at Koszęcin palace in Koszęcin.

Hadyna, the son of a Silesian teacher, was well known for his collection of folk songs. The world of legends and fantasies, ever-present in the tunes of Silesia, fascinated him from his earliest years and made him decide to form an ensemble which could render the richness and originality of Silesian folklore. To achieve his aim he needed talented and sensitive young people who were as yet unmannered by the stage. The performers were chosen from among 12,000 candidates and the castle in Koszecin became their home base. The first performance by "Slask" in the autumn of 1954 in Warsaw was something of a revelation for the whole country. The aim of the group is to show Silesia's age-old folklore which retains its own very specific identity in a large and much varied area. (excerpts from notes on LP "Slask, The Polish Song and Dance Ensemble, vol. 3". Muza. Polskie Nagrania SX 348)

Śląsk originally focused on the folk traditions of Upper Silesia, Cieszyn Silesia, and the Beskids. It was later expanded to include all Polish regions. The ensemble has performed more than 6,000 shows for over 20 million people worldwide. It has performed in the United States, Canada, Australia, France, Germany, Italy, Belgium, Sweden, the Netherlands, China, Mexico, and many other countries, as well as the Vatican.

The Śląsk ensemble has worked with such notable Polish composers as Wojciech Kilar.

Some of its most notable songs are Szła dzieweczka, Helokanie, Ondraszek, Głęboka studzienka, Karolinka.

== Awards ==
- Music and Art Award of Silesia (Silesian Music Prize in 1958, Artistic Prize in 1965)
- Honorary award from the President of the United States
- Honorary award from the ministry of culture of the Soviet Union
- Award from the Silesian Voivodeship
- Gold Medal from The World Peace Council in Stockholm in 1959

== Gallery ==
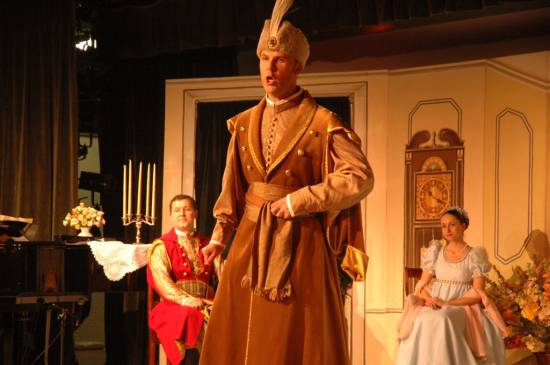
Moniuszkowski concert

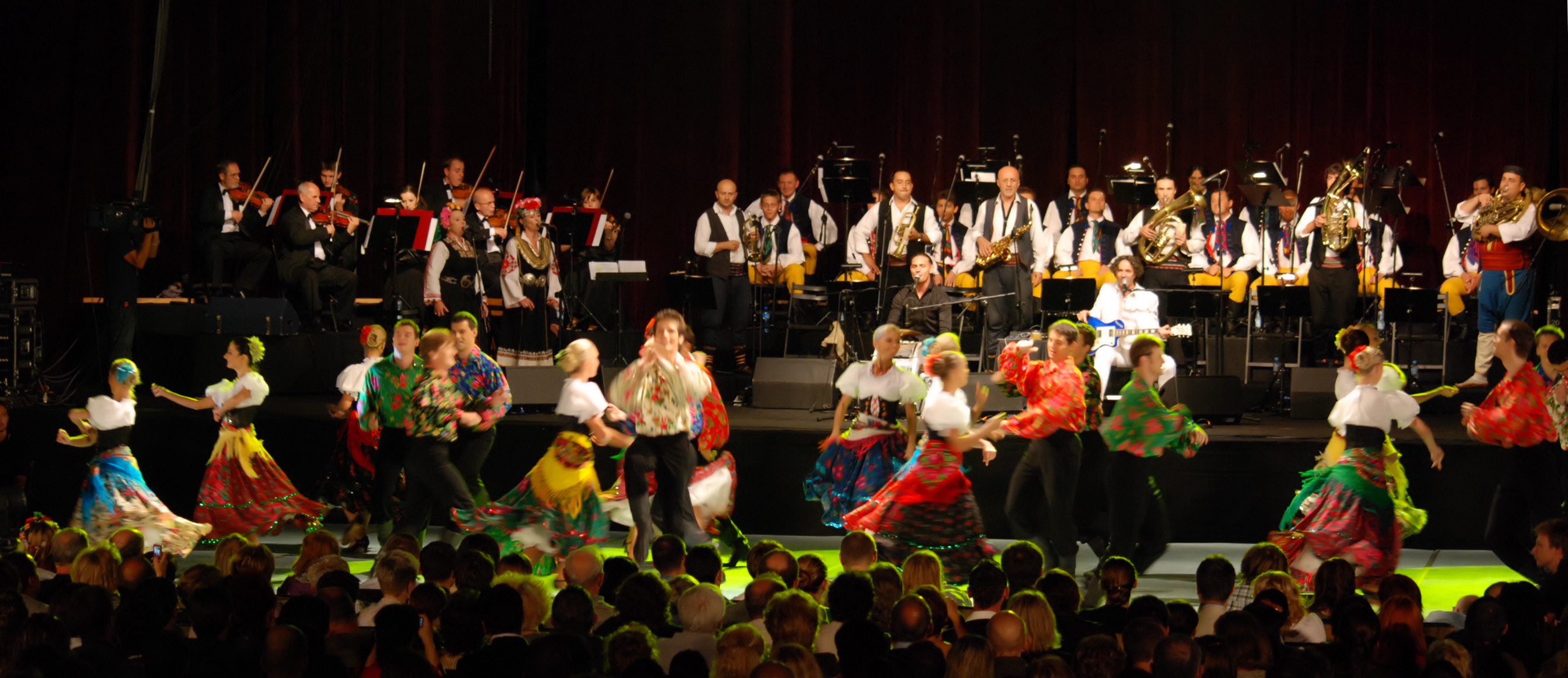
Anniversary concert in Katowice

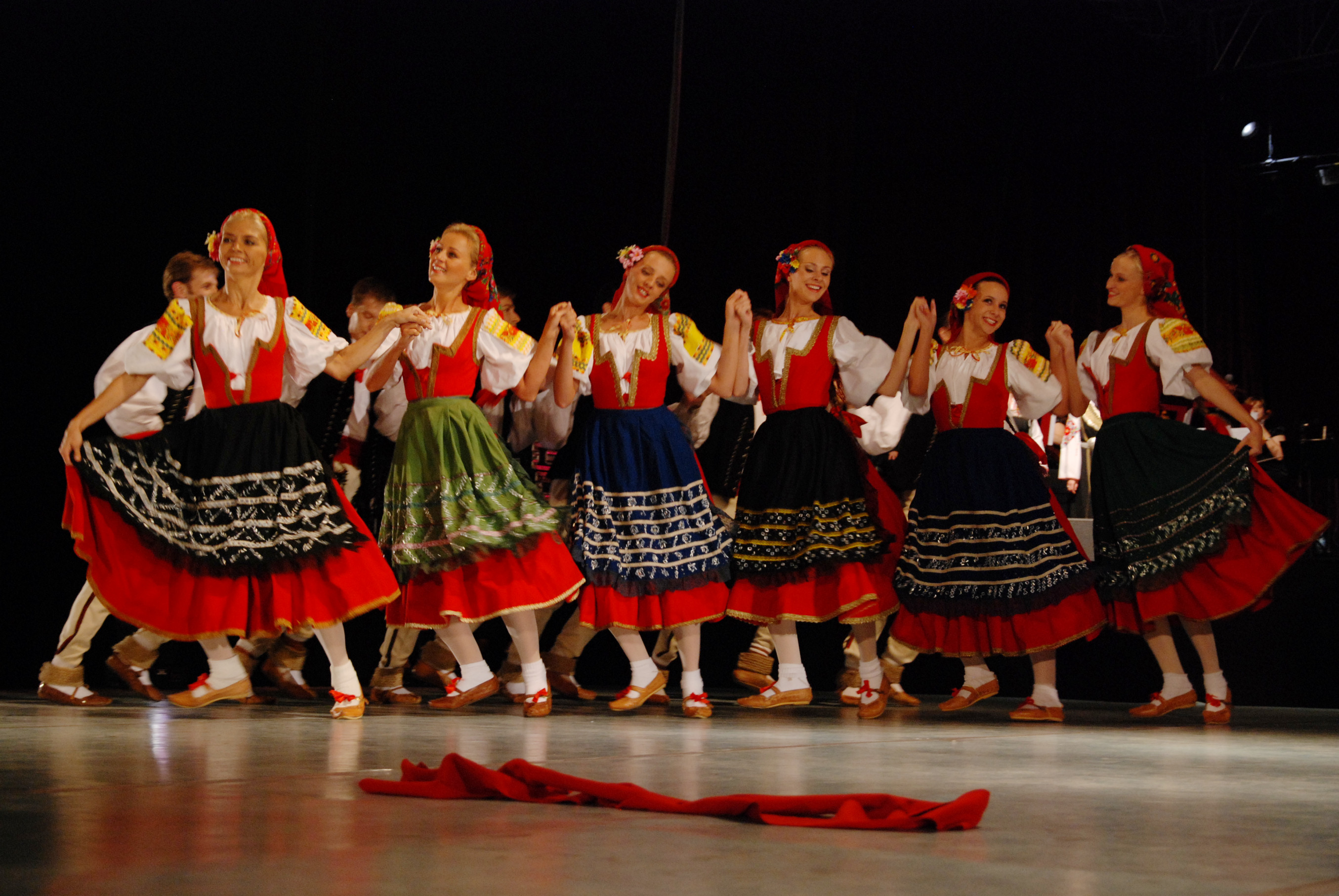
Anniversary concert in Katowice

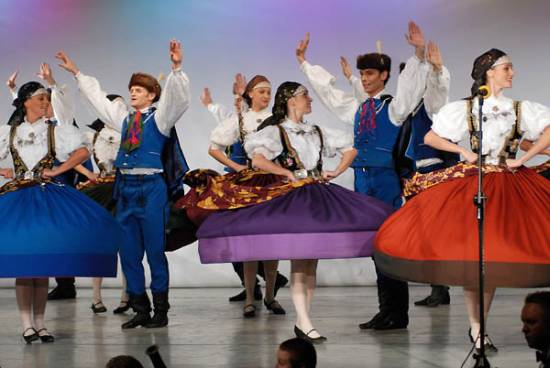
In 2006

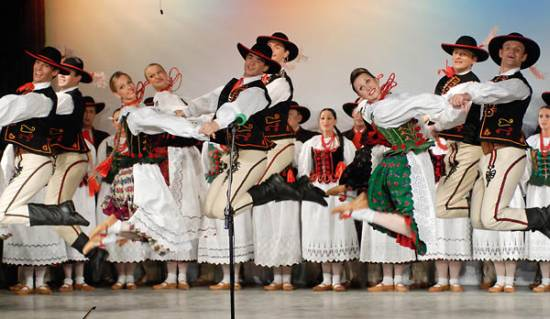
In 2006
