= Koszęcin palace =

Stately home in Koszęcin, Silesia, Poland

Coordinates: 50.6345°N 18.8388°E

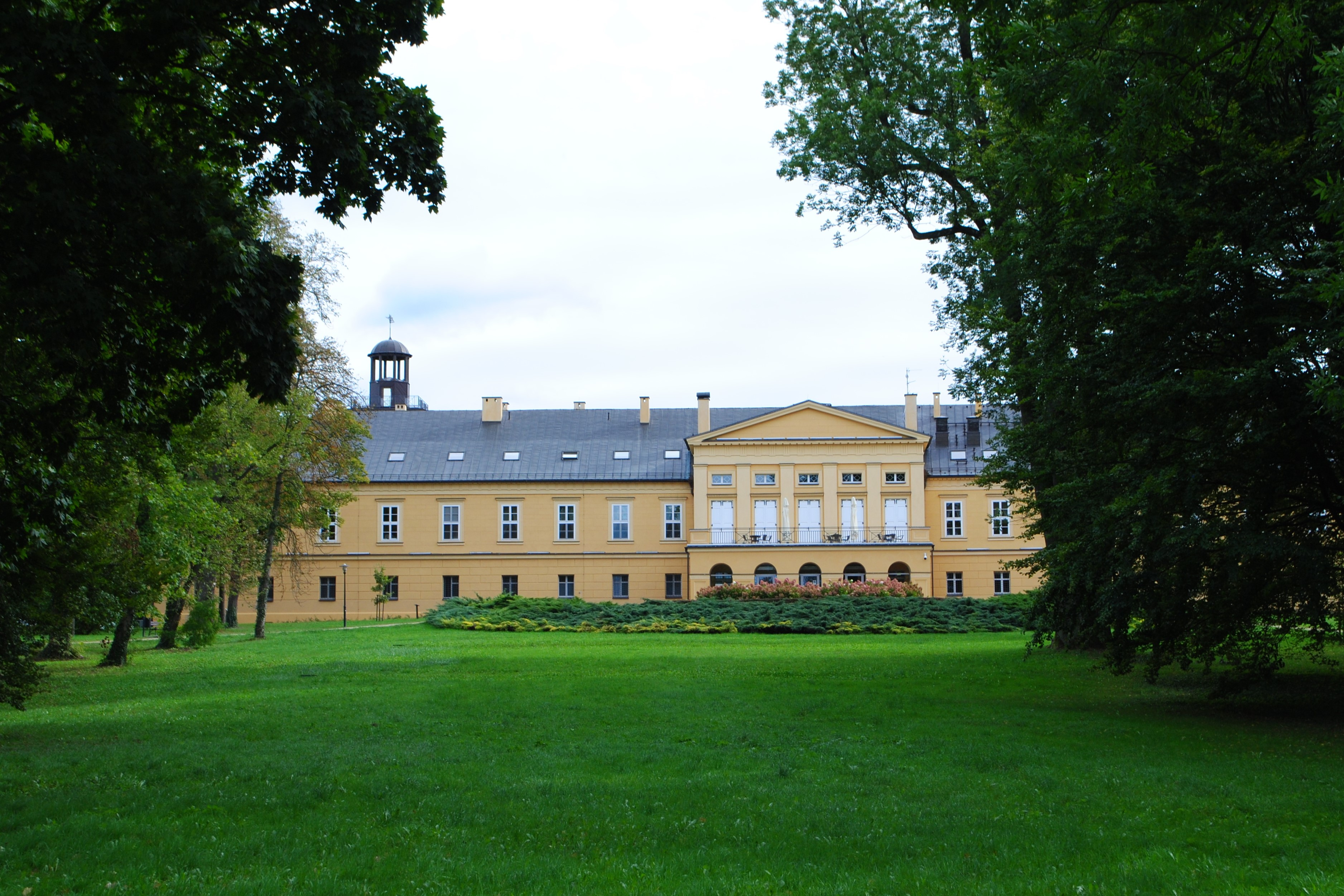
Koszęcin palace facing the park (2024)

Koszęcin Palace (Polish: Pałac w Koszęcinie; German: Schloss Koschentin) is a neoclassical palace in Koszęcin in Lubliniec County, in the Silesian Voivodeship. It is one of the largest palace complexes from the neoclassical period in Poland. Originally a wooden castle, it was rebuilt in the 17th century as a brick residence and later transformed into its present form in the 19th century under the princes of Hohenlohe-Ingelfingen, a branch of the House of Hohenlohe.

Since 1953, the palace has served as the headquarters of the Śląsk Song and Dance Ensemble, one of Poland's most renowned folk music and dance groups. The palace complex includes a landscaped park, a historic chapel repurposed as a concert hall, and several preserved architectural elements from different periods. Today, it functions as both a cultural center and a historic site, hosting artistic events, exhibitions, and educational activities.

== History ==
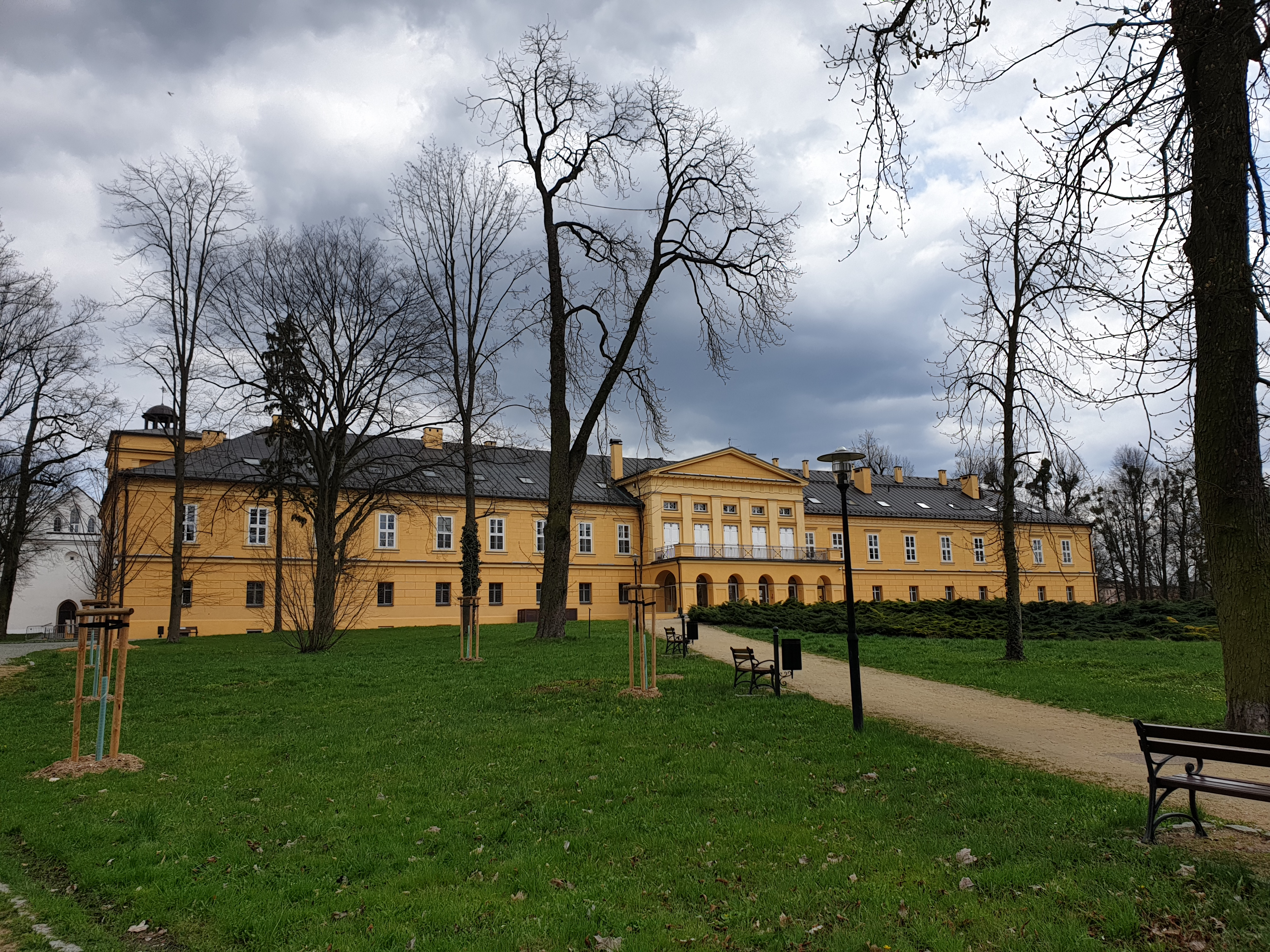
The western façade of Koszęcin palace (April 2021)

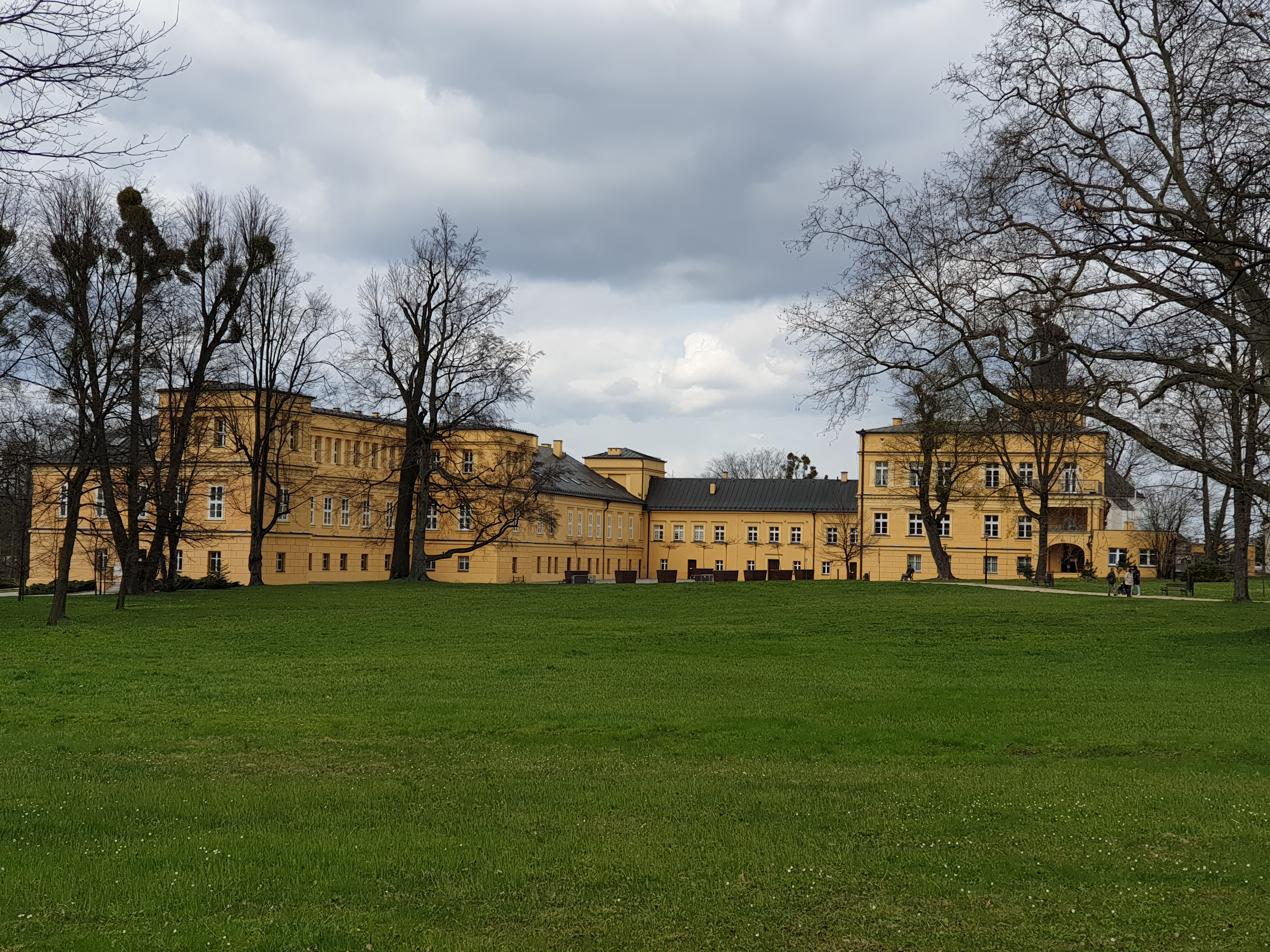
The courtyard of Koszęcin palace (April 2021) - To the left the western wing and to the right the wing containing the chapel

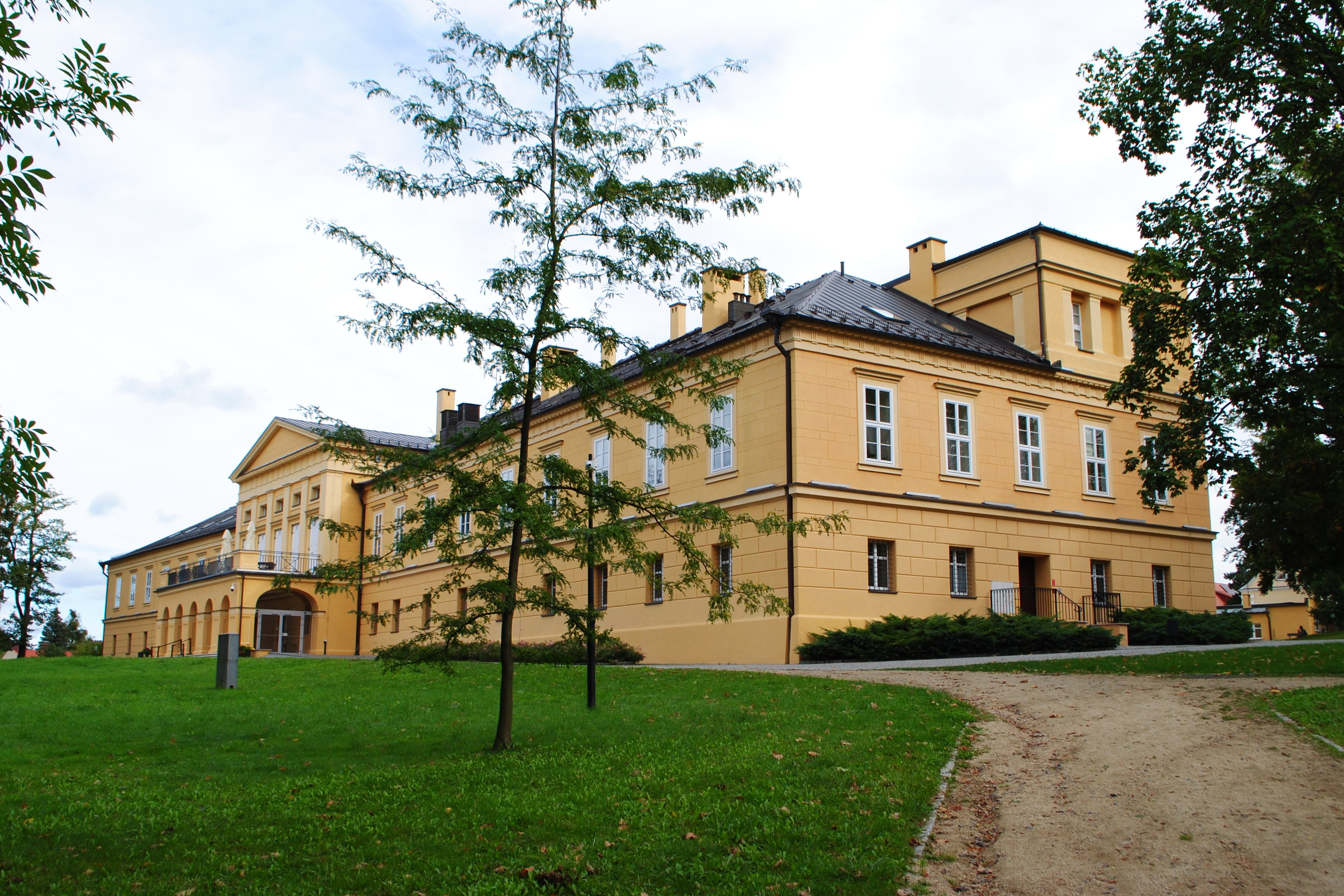
Another view of the western façade of Koszęcin palace (2024)

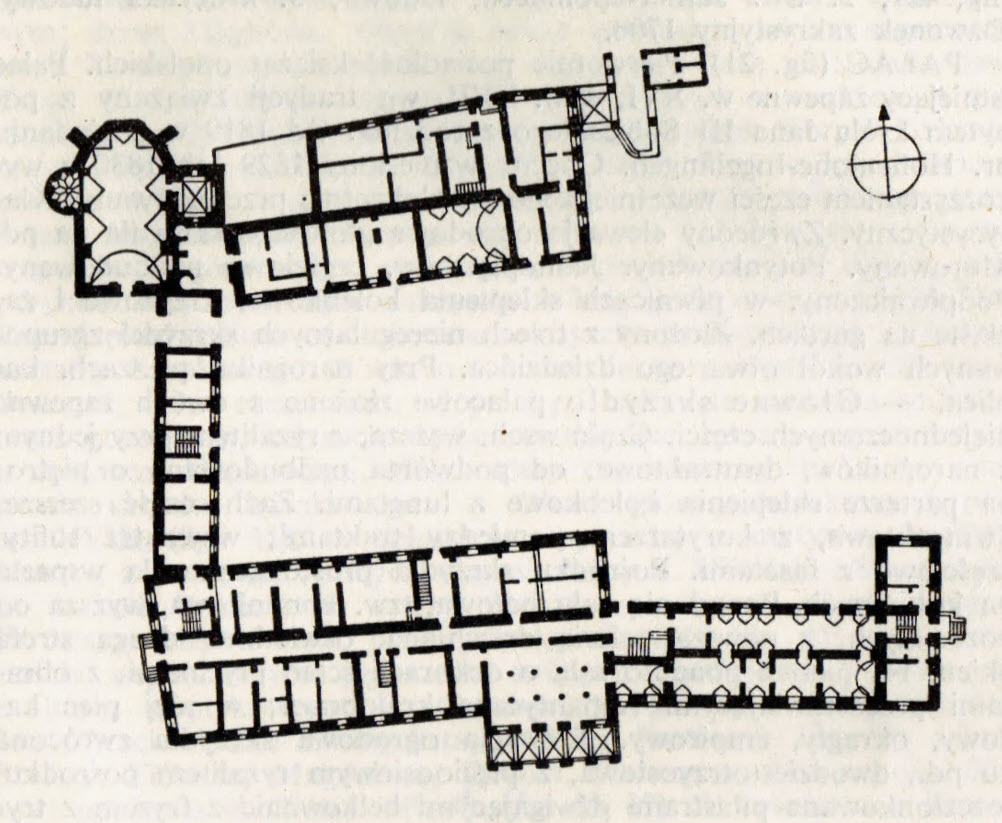
Floor plan of the Koszęcin palace

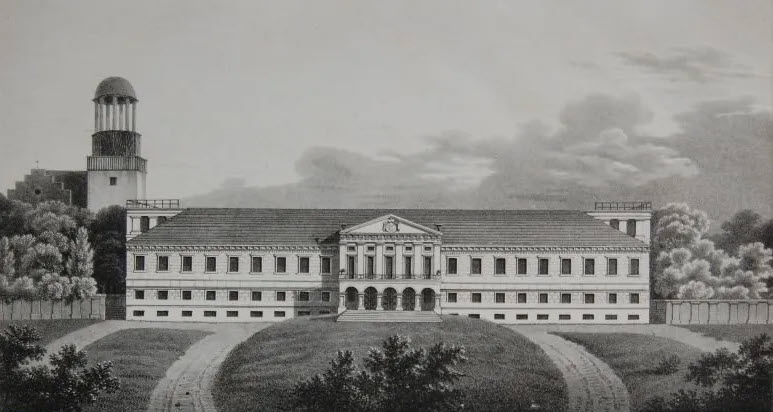
Koszęcin palace around 1850

The village, located in the far northeast of Upper Silesia, was first mentioned in historical records in 1302 under the name Gostonia when it was donated by the knight Alexius von Leckensteyn to the Cistercian monastery of Himmelwitz. In 1416, the settlement was referred to as Constantin. At the beginning of the 16th century, Koszęcin came into the possession of Margrave George of Ansbach-Jägerndorf before passing through several hands as pledged property. In 1587, the village was acquired by Hans von Kochczitz, whose son, Andreas von Kochczitz, is believed to have built the first castle in Koszęcin. However, he lost his estate in 1630 due to his Protestant faith.

From 1647 to 1693, the Koszęcin estate was owned by Nikolaus Philipp von Rauthen. It is said that during these times, the Polish King John III Sobieski and his court were guests at the palace. His wife, Queen Marie, resided in the palace while John III Sobieski embarked on his campaign against the Turks who were sieging Vienna in 1683.

After von Rauthen's death, the estate was inherited by the Sobek family, who held it until 1784. Count Carl Heinrich von Sobek expanded his holdings in 1774 by acquiring the Boronów estate with five villages and the Ollschin manor. In 1751, he built a theater next to the castle, which was later converted into a palace wing. However, due to financial difficulties caused by his extravagant lifestyle, he was forced to relinquish the Koszęcin estate after declaring bankruptcy in 1784.

=== The princes of Hohenlohe-Ingelfingen ===
After passing through multiple owners, the estate was acquired in 1804 by the Prussian general Frederick Louis, Prince of Hohenlohe-Ingelfingen (1746–1818). He had already gained possession of the Sławięcice (German: Slawentzitz) estate in 1782 through his marriage to Countess Amalie von Hoym and resided there. His son, Adolf Karl Friedrich Ludwig, Prince of Hohenlohe-Ingelfingen (1797–1873), also served in the Prussian military and briefly held the position of Minister President of Prussia. Between 1828 and 1830, he commissioned the construction of a new neoclassical palace in Koszęcin, incorporating older elements from the 17th century. The design was created by the architect Albert Roch from Berlin, and the work was supervised by the architect Friedrich Wilhelm Degner. The cornerstone was laid on 22 August 1828, the birthday of princess Louise, Adolf's wife. The scope of work included the demolition of the southern wing and the transformation of the west wing in the central part, for which a new main entrance to the palace was designed from the park side, topped with a triangular tympanum. At the ends of the wing, two flanking avant-corps were added, on which there were originally observation decks. The reconstruction also included the facades, which were given classicist features.

Prince Adolf was succeeded by his son, Prince Frederick William (1826–1895), who was also a general in the Prussian army. His brother, Prince Kraft (1827–1892), born at the palace, was also a Prussian general and an esteemed military theorist whose writings became classics in military studies. Koszęcin became the center of a large noble estate spanning both sides of the Mała Panew River, consisting of five knightly manors, 19 villages, and various industrial enterprises. By 1910, the estate covered approximately 200 square kilometres.

Although about 65% of Koszęcin's residents voted to remain in Germany during the 1921 Upper Silesia plebiscite, the town and its surrounding area were ceded to Poland in 1922, and its name was changed from Koschentin to Koszęcin. The tense political atmosphere in Eastern Upper Silesia at the time is illustrated by an incident in 1925: although nearly all residents spoke the local Polish dialect, some members of the community requested a monthly German-language church service, arguing that German-speaking residents should not be denied religious services. The local priest, Walter Gąska, initially rejected the request, but the church authorities approved it, leading to protests among pro-Polish residents.

Following the German occupation during World War II, the estates of the Hohenlohe-Ingelfingen family were confiscated by the Polish authorities. The last owner, the son of prince Frederick William, prince Karl Gottfried (1879–1960) fled to Austria and lived his last years in Kraubath an der Mur in Styria, where passed away without heirs.

The last prince, who was known in Koszęcin and the surrounding area as "the good prince," made significant contributions to the community of Koszęcin and several other municipalities by caring for the socio-economic well-being of the region's inhabitants. He was the benefactor of the architecturally magnificent Sacred Heart Church in Koszęcin and provided material and financial support for the parish house built in 1898. He also maintained the post office, which had been built by his father in 1881.

=== 1945 until modern times: the Śląsk Song and Dance Ensemble ===
Since 1953, Koszęcin palace has been home to the Śląsk Song and Dance Ensemble, named after Stanisław Hadyna. The entire life of the Ensemble takes place within the palace, where artistic activities, chamber concerts, and special events are held. The historic interiors also house the institution's offices.

Between 2005 and 2014, an extensive renovation of the palace and the park took place to revitalize the palace and make it ready for the future.

== Panorama ==
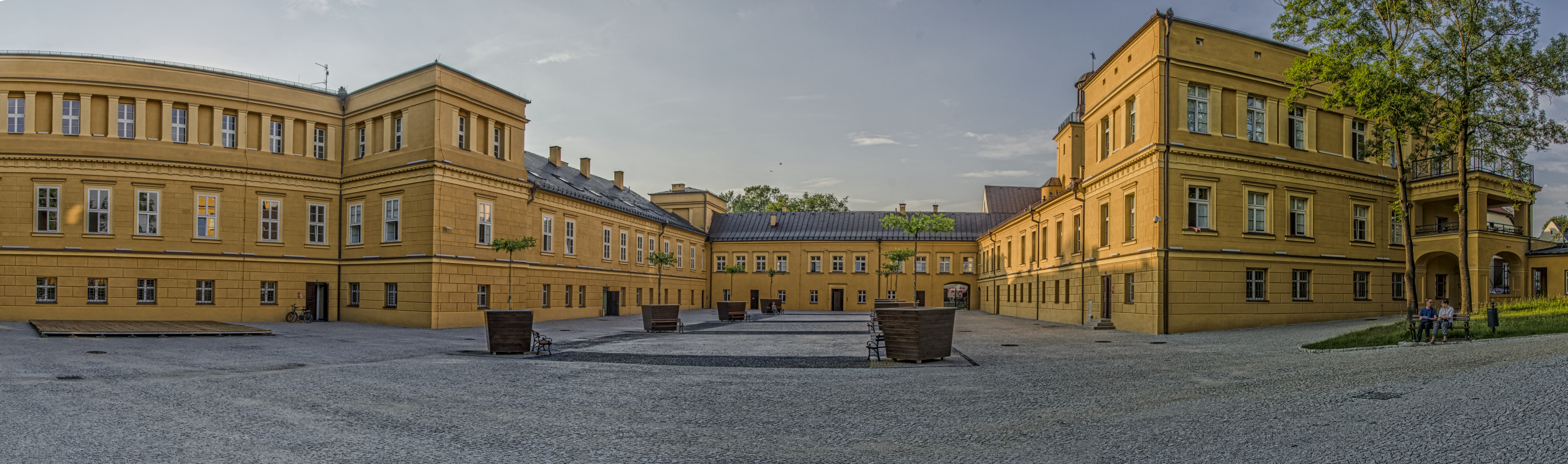
The palace courtyard

== Architecture ==
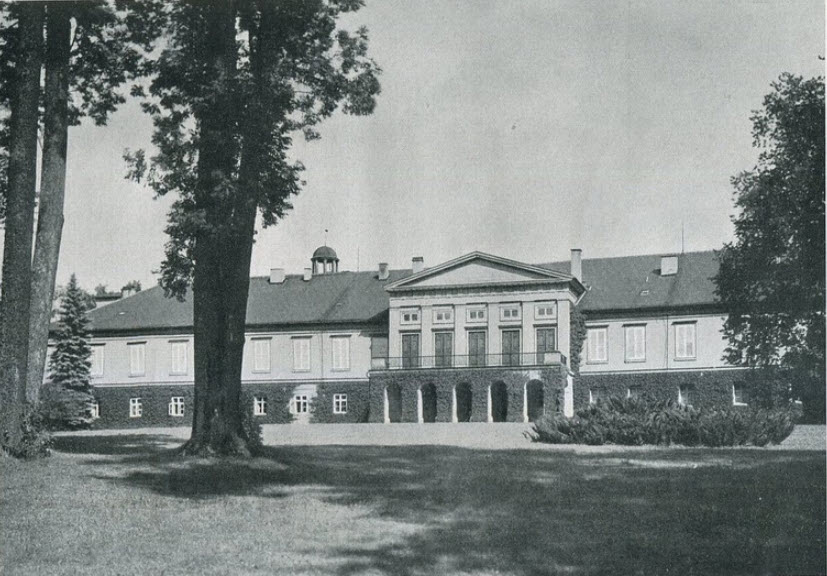
Koszęcin palace on a historic black and white picture (1944)

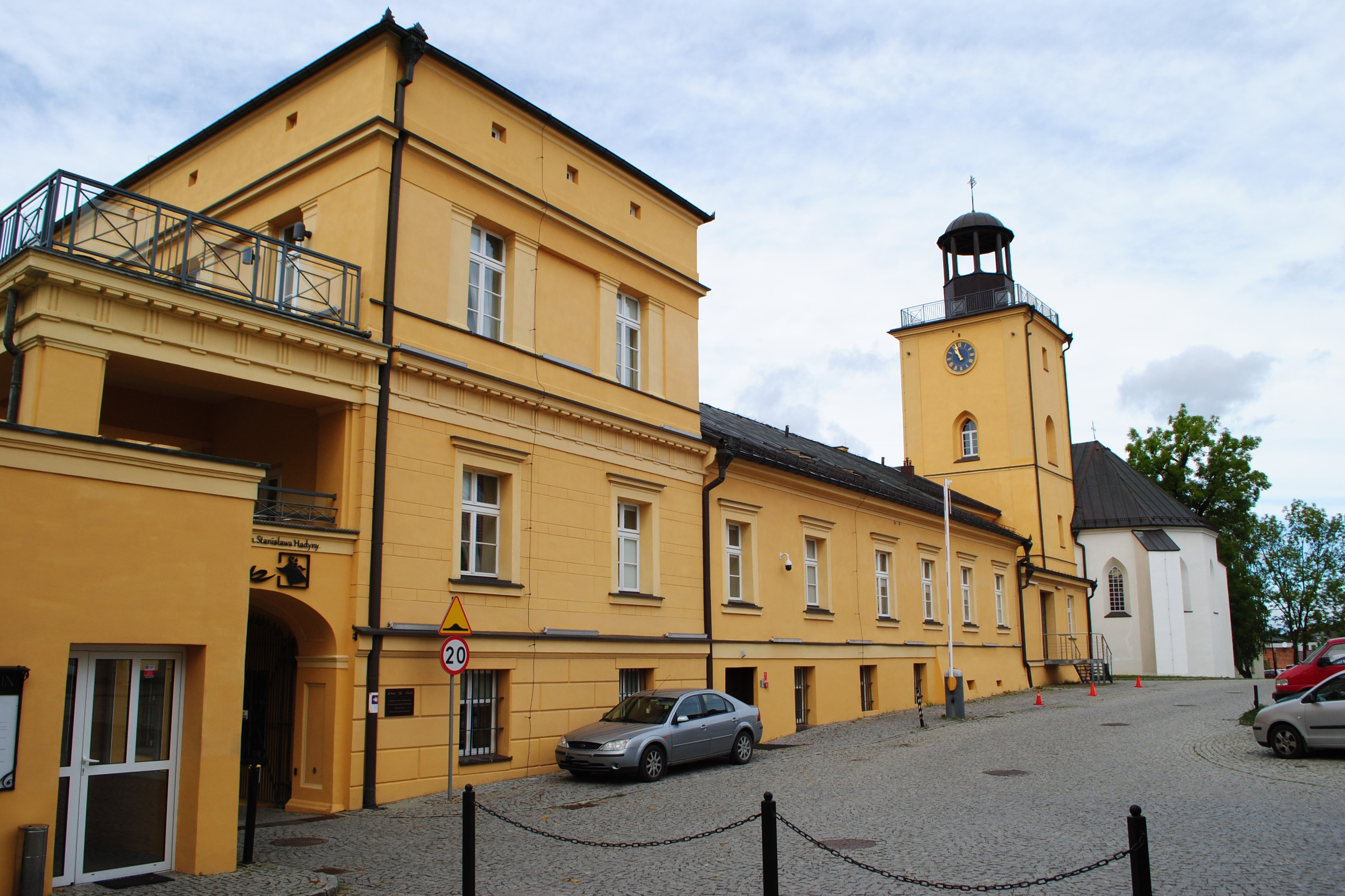
Koszęcin palace wing with chapel (2024)

The Koszęcin palace has been classified as a first-category historical monument. It is one of Poland's largest palace complexes from the Neoclassical period. The complex consists of three irregular wings: the main southern wing, the western wing, and the northern wing, the latter of which is connected to a tower with a chapel. The inner courtyard is open to the south, leading to a garden. The western park façade is characterized by a five-axis central projection with pilasters and a triangular pediment, in front of which lies a terrace. Some of the ground-floor rooms still feature barrel vaults.

The western wing, the most beautiful of the palace, contains the Ballroom and a terrace overlooking the park, as well as the so-called Green Hall, which features a preserved Empire-style round tiled stove.

Radar studies conducted in 1999 revealed that the oldest part of the palace complex is the northern wing, where stones dating back to the 16th century were discovered. The palace chapel, dedicated to the Assumption of the Virgin Mary and Saints Dionysius and Vitalis, had been inactive since 1945 but was renovated in 2001 and transformed into the "Śląsk" Chamber Concert Hall. The Ensemble's choir and orchestra can now host audiences in this hall, where chamber concerts are held during events organized at the "Śląsk" headquarters. The crypt beneath the former chapel is the resting place of members of the Hohenlohe-Ingelfingen family, including prince Adolf zu Hohenlohe-Ingelfingen.

Within the palace and park complex, there is also the Elwira Kamińska Pavilion, which served as an equestrian riding hall during the princely era. The former farm building from the late 19th century now functions as the Adolf Dygacz Creative Work House. There, visitors can explore the "Śląsk" Ensemble Memorial Room, which features a permanent exhibition of Silesian folk costumes and memorabilia from the group's numerous tours.

In the palace courtyard stands the "Professor’s Bench"—a monument to Professor Stanisław Hadyna, the founder and longtime director of the Ensemble. The statue depicts the professor sitting on a bench, smoking a pipe, and holding the sheet music for the famous song Helokanie. The monument has been in place since 2006.

== Park ==
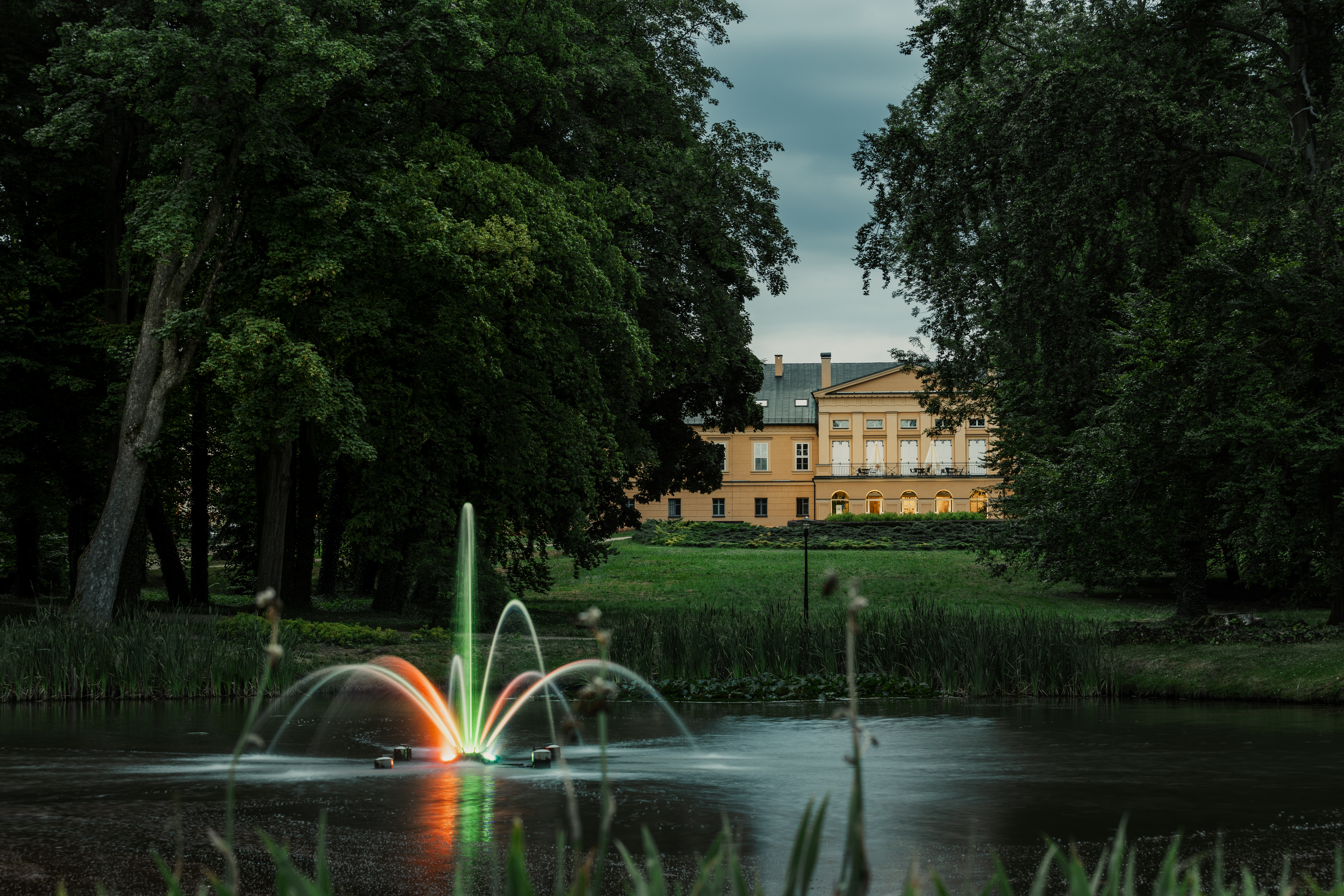
The Koszęcin palace park (2021)

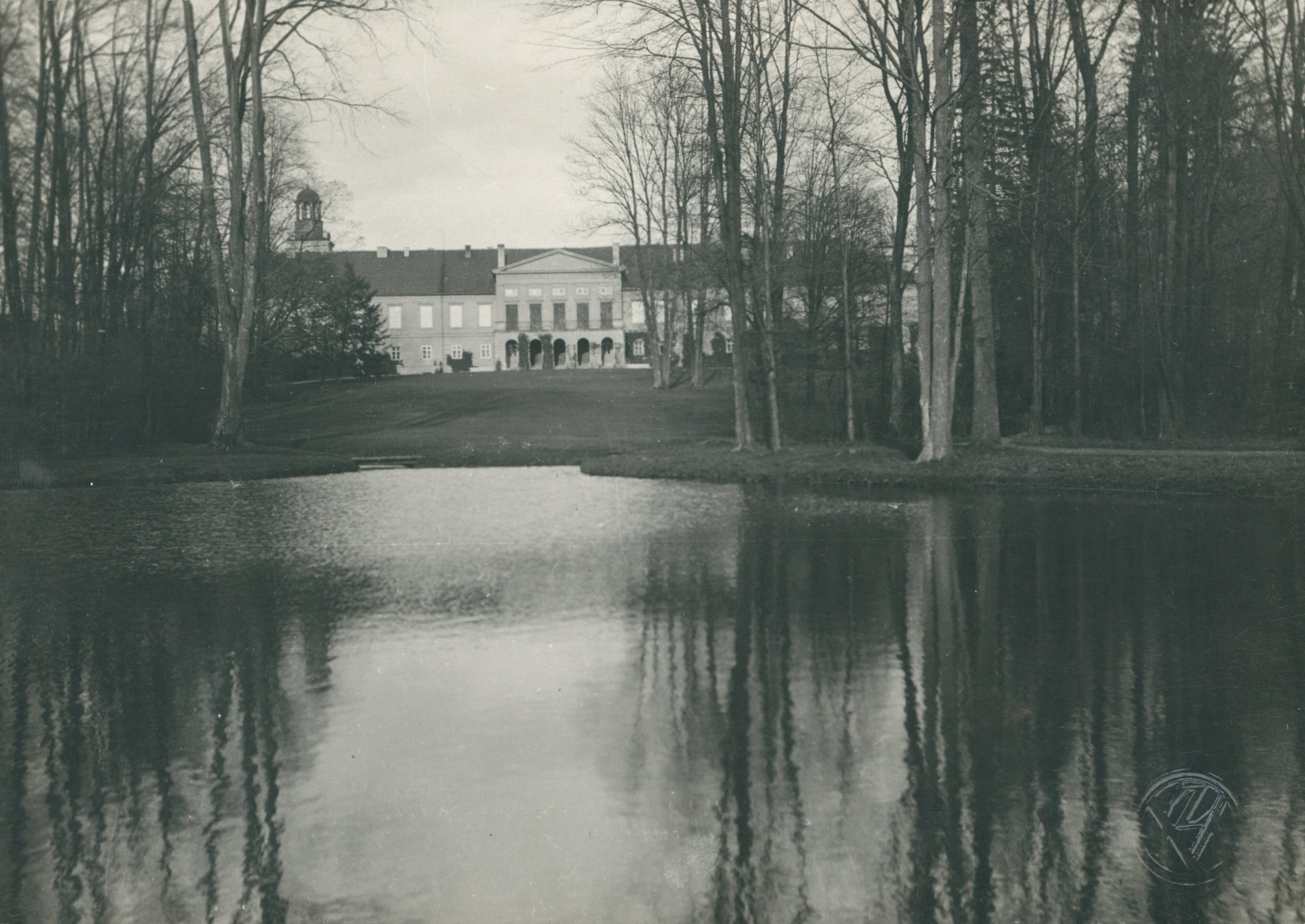
Koszęcin palace and park on a historic black and white picture (1931)

The palace is surrounded by an extensive English landscape park established in the mid-19th century. In its western section, there is a picturesque pond. The park features small-leaved linden trees, chestnuts, maples, common beeches, sycamores, tall ash trees, and pedunculate oaks. Some exotic trees also grow here, including the Eastern white pine, Canadian and black pine, Canadian hemlock, London plane tree, and American ash. Many of these trees are designated as natural monuments.

== Bibliography ==
- Harkawy, Aleksander (2010). "Fotografia w warsztacie konserwatora zabytków na przykáadzie doĞwiadczeĔ związanych z rekonstrukcją XIX-wiecznego wyglądu paáacu w KoszĊcinie" (PDF). Edukacja Plastyczna (in Polish): 55–67.
- Harkawy, Aleksander; Krupa, S (2010). "Badania historyczno-architektoniczne na potrzeby rewitalizacji zespołu pałacowo-parkowego". Wiadomości konserwatorskie województwa śląskiego. Zamki, pałace (in Polish). Katowice. pp. 127–142.
- "Koszęcin – przebudowa i rewitalizacja klasycystycznego zespołu pałacowo-parkoweg" (PDF). Renowacje I Zabytki (in Polish): 168–171. 2018.
