= Battle of Dürenstein order of battle =

Order of battle

Coordinates: 48°23′14″N 15°31′13″E

Battle of Dürenstein (or Dürnstein)
- Part of the War of the Third Coalition
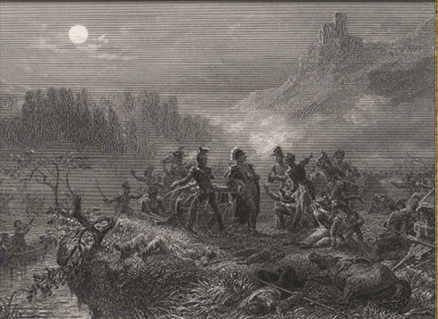
- Battle site, on the curve of the Danube, meant that the combatants at one end could not see what happened at the other.
Date	11 November 1805
Location	Dürenstein, Wachau region, Austria
Result	inconclusive

Belligerents
(France) First French Empire	Austrian Empire (Russia) Russian Empire

Commanders and leaders
Édouard Mortier; Théodore Maxime Gazan; Pierre Dupont de l'Étang	Mikhail Kutuzov; Johann Heinrich von Schmitt †; Mikhail Andreyevich Miloradovich; Dmitry Dokhturov

Strength
initially about 6,000–8,000, expanded to 8,000-10,000 by the end of the battle	about 24,000

Casualties and losses
~4,000, plus 47 officers and 895 men captured Two Eagles, a guidon, and five guns.	~4,000 dead and wounded. Two colors of Muskova Regiment Viatka.

The Battle of Dürenstein order of battle included a Coalition force of Russian and Austrian troops, under the overall command of Mikhail Kutuzov, and a single division of the Corps Mortier commanded by Édouard Mortier.

In pursuing the Austrian retreat from Bavaria, Mortier had over-extended the three divisions of his newly formed VIII. Corps, spreading them along the north bank of the Danube. Kutuzov enticed Mortier to send Théodore Maxime Gazan's 2nd Division into a trap; French troops were caught in a valley between two Russian columns, and were only rescued by the timely arrival of the 1st Division, under command of Pierre Dupont de l'Étang. The battle extended well into the night.

Both sides claimed a victory. The French lost more than a third of the Corps, and Gazan's division experienced over 40 percent losses. The Austrians and Russians also had heavy losses—close to 16 percent—but arguably the most significant was the death in action of Johann Heinrich von Schmitt, one of Austria's most capable chiefs of staff.

== Battle ==
Early in the morning on 11 November, three coalition columns departed from the vicinity of Krems an der Donau and Melk, circled around the promontory on which Dürnstein is located, to prepare to attack the French column that had encamped overnight at the village. In the morning, responding to rumors of a Russian rear guard, attacked the Russian encampment at nearby Stein; the two forces engaged head-on until afternoon when one of the Russian columns finally made its way through the mountain defiles and attacked the French rear. The French were trapped in the Danube canyon, attacked from the front and the rear by the Russians. A second French division, under command of Dupont, arrived and attacked the Russian column. Following this attack, another Coalition column arrived and attacked the French. The battle extended well into the night before both sides stopped.

The French lost more than a third of the VIII. Corps, and Gazan's division experienced over 40 percent losses. Mortier had failed to protect his northern flank, despite specific instructions from Napoleon. The Corps Mortier was disbanded and distributed to other Corps, but Gazan received the Officers Cross of the Legion of Honor. The Austrians and Russians also had heavy losses—close to 16 percent—but arguably the most significant was the death in action of Johann Heinrich von Schmitt, one of Austria's most capable chiefs of staff.

== French Order of Battle ==
The French division was part of the newly created VIII. Corps, the Corps Mortier, under command of Édouard Mortier. The role of this Corps was to pursue and defeat the retreating remnants of the Austrian army on the north bank of the Danube river, and to prevent the Russian army, under command of Mikhail Kutuzov, from crossing the river and uniting his force with either the Austrians or with an approaching Russian army.

On 6 November Édouard Adolphe Mortier commanded the following forces:

=== First Division ===
- Commanded by Pierre Dupont de l'Étang. This was formerly this 1st Division of VI. Corps, and included six battalions, and three squadrons, most of which were involved in the fighting after mid-afternoon.
  - Generals of Brigade Jean Gabriel Marchand (1765–1851) and Marie François Rouyer (1765–1823), commanding.
    - 9th Light Infantry Regiment, two battalions.
    - 32nd Line Infantry Regiment, two battalions.
    - 96th Line Infantry Regiment, two battalions.
    - 1st Hussar Regiment, three squadrons.

=== Second Division ===
- Commanded by Maxime Gazan. This was formerly the 2nd Division of the V. Corps, and included nine battalions, three squadrons, three guns.
  - Generals of Brigade Jean François Graindorge (1772–1810), and François Frédéric Campana (1771–1807), commanding.
    - 4th Light Infantry Regiment, three battalions.
    - 54th Line Infantry Regiment, three battalions.
    - 100th Line Infantry Regiment, three battalions.
    - 103rd Line Infantry Regiment, three battalions.
    - 4th Dragoon Regiment Regiment, three squadrons.
    - Three field guns.

=== Third Division ===
- Commanded by Jean-Baptiste Dumonceau (Batavian Division, formerly 3rd Division of the 2nd Corps). These troops were not involved in the fighting.

=== Dragoon Division ===
- Commanded by Dominique Louis Antoine Klein.
  - 1st Dragoon Regiment
  - 2nd Dragoon Regiment
  - 4th Dragoon Regiment
  - 14th Dragoon Regiment

Except for the three squadrons attached to Gazan's column, these were not involved in the fighting.

=== Flotilla ===
- Frigate Captain Lostange
  - Danube fleet of 50 ships.

Total: 15 battalions, six squadrons, six guns, approximately 12,000 men, not all of which were involved in the fighting.

== Allied Order of Battle ==
The Russian General Mikhail Kutuzov commanded the Allied Army of approximately 24,000.

=== First Column ===
- Commanded by General of Brigade Prince Pyotr Ivanovich Bagration
  - Grenadier Regiment Kiev, three battalions.
  - Infantry Regiment Azov, three battalions.
  - 6th Jäger Regiment, three battalions.
  - Hussar Regiment Pavlograd, ten squadrons.

=== Second Column ===
- Commanded by Lieutenant General von Essen
  - Grenadier Regiment Little Russia, three battalions.
  - Infantry Regiment Apscheron, three battalions.
  - Infantry Regiment Smolensk, three battalions.
  - Dragoon Regiment Tschernigov, five squadrons.

=== Third Column ===
- Commanded by Lieutenant General Dmitry Dokhturov
  - 8th Jäger regiment, one battalion.
  - Hussar Regiment Mariupol, ten squadrons.
  - Infantry Regiment Butirsk, three battalions.
  - Infantry Regiment Moscow, three battalions.

=== Fourth Column ===
- Commanded by Lieutenant General Schepelev, nine battalions of infantry.
  - Infantry Regiment Novgorod, three battalions.
  - Infantry Regiment Narva, three battalions.
  - Infantry Regiment Podolien, three battalions.

=== Fifth Column ===
- Lieutenant General Freiherr von Maltitz, nine battalions of infantry.
  - Infantry Regiment Viatka, three battalions.
  - Infantry Regiment Briansk, three battalions.
  - Infantry Regiment Yaroslav, three battalions.

=== Sixth Column ===
- Lieutenant General Georg Andreas von Rosen (1776–1841)
  - Infantry Regiment New Ingermannland, three battalions.
  - Infantry Regiment Vladimir, three battalions.
  - Infantry Regiment Galicia, three battalions.
  - Dragoon Regiment Twer, five squadrons
  - Dragoon Regiment Saint Petersburg, five squadrons

The Sixth Column did not take part in the fighting.

=== Austrian Column ===
- Major General Johann Nepomuk von Nostitz-Rieneck.
  - 7th Border Infantry Regiment Brooder, two battalions.
  - 9th Border Infantry Regiment Peterwardein, two battalions.

=== Austrian Cavalry ===
- Lieutenant Field Marshal Friedrich Karl Wilhelm, Fürst zu Hohenlohe, 22 squadrons of cavalry.
  - 7th Cuirassier Regiment Lothringen, eight squadrons.
  - 5th Cuirassier Regiment Nassau-Usingen, eight squadrons.
  - 4th Hussar Regiment Hessen-Homburg, six squadrons.

Total: 58 battalions, 62 squadrons, 14 artillery batteries, approximately 24,000 men and 168 artillery pieces.

== Sources ==
=== Bibliography ===
- (in German) Autorenkollektiv. "Rosen." Meyers Konversationslexikon. Leipzig und Wien: Verlag des Bibliographischen Instituts, Vierte Auflage, 1885–1892.
- (in German) Bodart, Gaston. Militär-historisches Kriegs-Lexikon (1618–1905). Wien: Stern, 1908.
- (in German) Egger, Rainer. Das Gefecht bei Dürnstein-Loiben 1805. Wien: Bundesverlag, 1986.
- Goetz, Robert. 1805: Austerlitz, the Destruction of the Third Coalition. Mechanicsburg, PA: Stackpole Books, 2005, ISBN 1-85367-644-6.
- Smith, Digby. Napoleonic Wars Databook: 1805 , London: Greenhill Publishing Co., 1998, ISBN 1-85367-276-9.
- Smith, Digby. Napoleon's Regiments. PA: Stackpole, 2001. ISBN 1-85367-413-3.
