= Prince Kraft of Hohenlohe-Ingelfingen =

Prussian general (1827–1892)

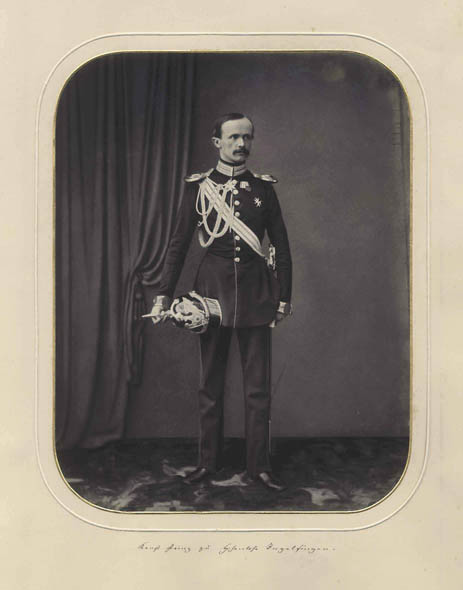
Prince Kraft zu Hohenlohe-Ingelfingen, circa 1865.

Kraft Prinz zu Hohenlohe-Ingelfingen (2 January 1827 – 16 January 1892) was a Prussian general and military writer during the time of the German Empire.

== Early life ==
Kraft Karl August zu Hohenlohe-Ingelfingen was born at the palace in Koschentin in Upper Silesia. He was the son of Prince Adolf zu Hohenlohe-Ingelfingen (1797–1873), and a grandson of Frederick Louis, Prince of Hohenlohe-Ingelfingen (1746–1818), who commanded the Prussians at Jena.

Educated with great rigour, owing to the impoverishment of the family estates during the Napoleonic Wars, Kraft was sent into the Prussian Army. There, he was commissioned to the artillery as the least expensive arm of the service. He joined the Prussian Guard artillery in 1845, and it was soon discovered that he had unusual aptitudes as an artillery officer. For a time his fellow officers resented the presence of a prince, until it was found that he made no attempt to use his social position to secure advancement.

== Promotions ==
After serving as a military attaché in Vienna and on the Transylvanian frontier during the Crimean War, Kraft was made a captain on the general staff, and in 1856 personal aide-de-camp to the king, remaining, however, in close touch with the artillery. In 1864, having become major and then lieutenant colonel, he resigned the staff appointments to become commander of the new Guard Field Artillery regiment. In the following year, he became colonel.

Kraft saw his first real active service in 1866. In the hold advance of the Guard corps on the Austrian right wing at Königgrätz during the Austro-Prussian War, he led the Guard reserve artillery with success, and after the short war ended he turned his energies, now fortified by experience, to the tactical training of the Prussian artillery.

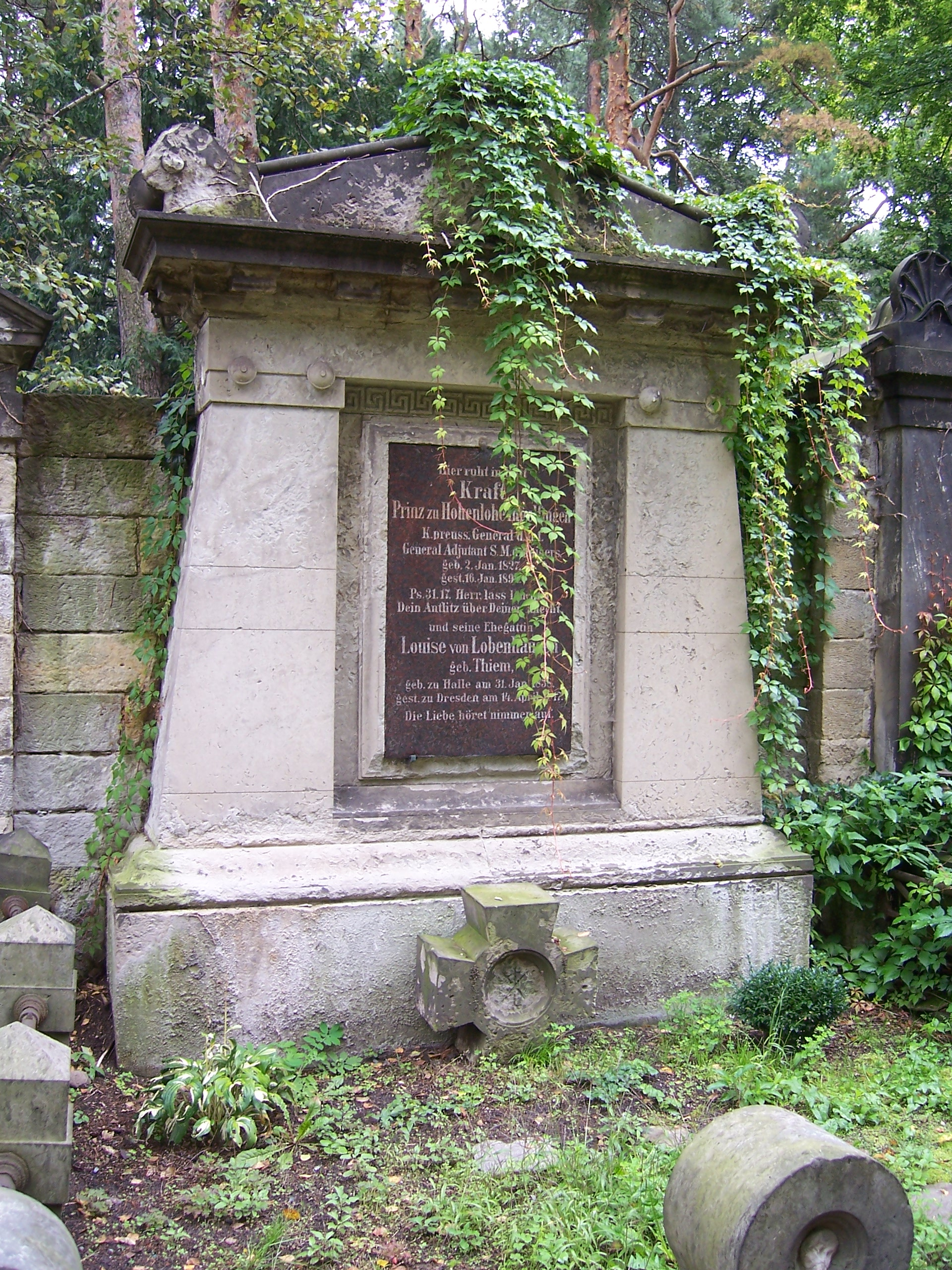
Prince Kraft's grave in Johannisfriedhof in Dresden.

In 1868 Kraft was made a major-general and assigned to command the Guard artillery brigade. At the same moment he became a member of the Artillerie Prüfungskommission. As commander of the Guard artillery brigade Kraft gained great distinction during the Franco-Prussian War, especially at Gravelotte and Sedan. He was in control of the artillery attack on the fortifications of Paris. In 1873 he was placed in command of an infantry division, and three years later was promoted to lieutenant-general. While he retired in 1879, he was made general of infantry in 1883 and then general of artillery in 1889.

== Writings ==
Kraft's military writings were numerous, and amongst them several have become classics. These are Briefe über Artillerie (English translation Letters on Artillery, 1887); Briefe über Strategie (1877; Letters on Strategy, 1898); and Gespräche über Reiterei (1887; Conversations on Cavalry). The Briefe über Infanterie and Briefe über Kavallerie (Letters on Infantry, Letters on Cavalry, 1889) are of less importance, though interesting as a reflection of prevailing German ideas.

== Memoirs ==
Kraft's memoirs (Aus meinem Leben) were prepared in retirement near Dresden, and the first volume (1897) created such a sensation that eight years were allowed to elapse before the publication was continued. Kraft died near Dresden in 1892.

== Orders and decorations ==
- Kingdom of Prussia:
  - Knight of Honour of the Johanniter Order, 12 October 1846
  - Knight of the Royal Crown Order, 3rd Class, 18 January 1864
  - Knight's Cross of the Royal House Order of Hohenzollern, with Swords, 1864; Commander's Cross, 20 September 1866
  - Iron Cross (1870), 1st Class
  - Pour le Mérite (military), 16 February 1871
  - Knight of the Red Eagle, 2nd Class with Swords and Oak Leaves, 1871; 1st Class with Swords and Crown, 16 September 1875
  - Service Award Cross
- Baden: Commander of the Zähringer Lion, 2nd Class with Oak Leaves and Swords, 1867
- Kingdom of Bavaria: Grand Commander of the Military Merit Order
- (Saxe-Coburg and Gotha) (Duchy of Saxe-Altenburg) (Saxe-Meiningen) Ernestine duchies: Grand Cross of the Saxe-Ernestine House Order, with Swords, 1872
- Grand Duchy of Hesse: Grand Cross of the Merit Order of Philip the Magnanimous, with Swords, 1 May 1870
- Mecklenburg-Schwerin: Military Merit Cross, 1st Class
- Oldenburg: Grand Commander of Honour of the Order of Duke Peter Friedrich Ludwig, with Swords, 26 March 1871
- Kingdom of Saxony: Commander of the Albert Order, 1st Class with War Decoration, 1870
- Schaumburg-Lippe: Military Merit Medal
- Württemberg: Grand Cross of the Friedrich Order, with Swords, 1871
- Austrian Empire: Knight of the Iron Crown, 2nd Class with War Decoration, 1864
- French Empire: Commander of the Legion of Honour
- Russian Empire:
  - Knight of St. Anna, 1st Class
  - Knight of St. George, 4th Class

== Literature ==
- Kurt von Priesdorff: Soldatisches Führertum. Band 8, Hanseatische Verlagsanstalt Hamburg, ohne Jahr, pp. 76–79.
- Bernhard von Poten: Hohenlohe-Ingelfingen, Kraft Prinz zu. In: Allgemeine Deutsche Biographie (ADB). Band 50, Duncker & Humblot, Leipzig 1905, pp. 444–446.
