= George Gemünder =

German-born American violin maker (1816 – 1899)

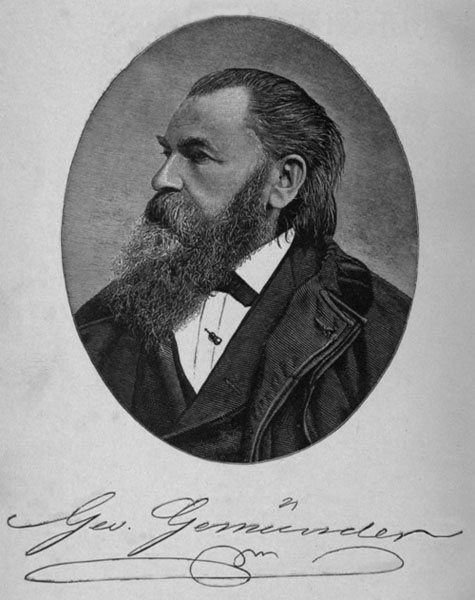

Georg (George) Gemünder (13 April 1816 Ingelfingen – 15 January 1899) was a German-born American violin maker who worked in Boston, Massachusetts, and later, Astoria, New York. With his brother August and others, he pioneered the construction of quality violins in the United States.

== Biography ==
He was a pupil of Jean-Baptiste Vuillaume in Paris, and moved to the United States in 1847, establishing himself in Boston. In 1851, one of his violins won a medal at the World's Fair in London. In 1852, he moved to Astoria, now part of New York City. Vuillaume, and other European makers violin makers often applied chemicals to their instruments to produce a pseudo-antique look and—some believed—a desirable tone quality. Gemünder, however, felt that wood so treated would soon lose its resonance and render treated instruments worthless. Gemünder succeeded in making excellent violins without chemical treatments.

He was unusually successful in the model and finish of his instruments, and especially the varnish. He so faithfully reproduced the distinctive characteristics of old Italian violins that those made by him are not infrequently mistaken for genuine Cremonas. At the Vienna exhibition of 1873, Gemünder's violin the "Kaiser" fooled the judges, who assumed it was an Italian violin from the classical period, and therefore ineligible for prizes. Gemünder also received medals from exhibitions held in Paris (1867), New York (1870), Vienna (1873), Philadelphia (1876 “hors concours”), Amsterdam (1883), Nice (1883–1884), London (1884), New Orleans (1884–1885 “hors concours”), and London (1885).

He wrote a book called Georg Gemünder's Progress in Violin-making (Astoria, New York, 1881), to which he prefixed an autobiographical sketch.
