= Friedrich Karl Wilhelm, Fürst zu Hohenlohe =

Austrian general (1752–1814)

- Born: 16 February 1752; Ingelfingen, Hohenlohe-Ingelfingen
- Died: 16 January 1814 (aged 61) Košice, present day Slovakia
- Allegiance: Habsburg monarchy
- Branch: Colonel and Proprietor, 7th (later 2nd) Dragoon Regiment
- Service years: 1772–1809 (retired)
- Rank: Field marshal
- Conflicts: French Revolutionary Wars; Napoleonic Wars
- Awards: Military Order of Maria Theresa; Order of Saint Hubert

Friedrich Karl Wilhelm, Fürst (prince) zu Hohenlohe-Ingelfingen (February 16, 1752 – January 16, 1814) was a general in the military service of the House of Habsburg during the French Revolutionary Wars and the Napoleonic Wars. He was born in Ingelfingen, in southwest Germany, on 16 February 1752.

== Family ==
The Family of Hohenlohe-Ingelfingen descended from Christian Kraft, Graf v. Hohenlohe-Ingelfingen, whose four sons held the title concurrently. Christian Kraft was a younger son of the Count of Hohenlohe-Langenburg und Gleichen. He married circa 1700 to Maria Katharina Sophia v. Hohenlohe-Waldenburg, a cousin, and they had seventeen children, ten of which survived past adolescence. Heinrich August zu Hohenlohe-Ingelfingen (1715–1796), the twelfth child, married circa 1750 to Wilhelmine Eleonore zu Hohenlohe-Neuenstein-Oehringen (1714–1794); among their children were Friedrich Karl Wilhelm, and Frederick Louis.

== Early military career ==
Friedrich Karl Wilhelm entered Habsburg military as a Cuirassier in 1772. He commanded the Dragoon regiment Waldeck in Austria's wars with the Ottoman Empire in 1788–1789. During the French Revolutionary Wars, he served in the Imperial Army of the Upper Rhine, under command of General of Cavalry Dagobert Sigmund von Wurmser. In 1781, he was a major in 39th Dragoon Regiment Waldeck, which he commanded as Colonel in Austria's wars against the Turks in 1788–89. He also received the Bavarian Order of Saint Hubert.

== Action in the French Revolutionary Wars ==
In 1793 he served in the Army of the Upper Rhine, under General of Cavalry Graf Wurmser. In 1794 he fought on the Rhine, under Feldzeugmeister (General of Infantry) Friedrich Wilhelm, Fürst zu Hohenlohe-Kirchberg and was distinguished in the actions near Kaiserslautern (20 September) and Oggersheim (9 October). On 11 October of that year Prince Friedrich was promoted to Major General. In 1795, the prince took part in the successful assault on Mainz (29 October) and was victorious in the action at Bacharach (17 December). In 1796 he served in Germany under Archduke Charles and was present at the Battle of Würzburg as a cavalry brigade commander.

In 1799, the prince fought on the Rhine as a brigade commander in Lieutenant Field Marsh Johann Sigismund, Count Riesch's cavalry division and was distinguished in the battle of Stockach, on 25–26 March, when his Cuirassiers broke and scattered the reserve cavalry division of Jean-Joseph Ange d'Hautpoul.

On 3 November, on his own initiative, he attacked the French under Michel Ney at Löchgau-Erligheim on the River Enz, defeating them decisively, and driving them west to Sinsheim. This action convinced François Lecourbe, French commander of the siege of Philippsburg, to withdraw. For the prince's action on the Enz, Francis II, Holy Roman Emperor awarded him the Knight's Cross of the Military Order of Maria Theresa on 21 November 1799.

On 2–3 December 1799, he commanded the 3rd Assault Column, with three battalions and 26 squadrons of cavalry) under overall command of Lieutenant Field Marshal Anton, Graf Sztáray, in the imperial victory at Wiesloch over François Lecourbe's French troops. On 6 March 1800 he was promoted to Lieutenant Field Marshal and transferred back to the imperial army in southern Germany, under command of Pál Kray. Subsequently commanded a cavalry division in the Imperial center at the defeat in the battle of Hohenlinden on 3 December.

== Napoleonic Wars ==
In 1801, he was appointed Colonel-Proprietor (Inhaber) of 7th Dragoon Regiment. Prior to the Capitulation of Ulm, he, Karl Philipp, Prince of Schwarzenberg, and Archduke Ferdinand d'Este broke out of the French cordon surrounding the city and escaped to Bohemia, hotly pursued by the French cavalry. On 5 November, he commanded an Austrian cavalry column at the Battle of Dürenstein and a few weeks later, he commanded the Austrian cavalry at the Allied defeat at the Battle of Austerlitz.

The decisive French victory at the Battle of Austerlitz over the combined Russian and Austrian armies forced the Austrian withdrawal from the Coalition. The subsequent Peace of Pressburg, signed on 26 December 1805, reinforced the earlier treaties of Campo Formio and Lunéville. Furthermore, Austria ceded land to Napoleon's German allies, and paid an indemnity of 40 million francs. Victory at Austerlitz also gave Napoleon the latitude to create a buffer zone of German states between France and Prussia, Russia, and Austria. These measures did not establish a lasting peace on the continent. Prussian worries about growing French influence in Central Europe sparked the War of the Fourth Coalition in 1806, in which Austria did not participate.

Austria did not return to active war against France until the Danube Campaign of 1809. Although the Habsburgs eked out a victory at Aspern and Essling, the campaign resulted in yet another decisive defeat at Wagram. In this campaign, the prince saw no active service, although for nine months in 1809, he served as Adlatus (noble adjutant and mentor) of the Commanding General in Galicia. In December, he retired to his estates in Hungary, where he died on 16 June 1815 in Kaschau, today Košice, in Slovakia.

Promotions

- Major: 9 November 1781
- Oberstleutnant: 1 May 1784
- Oberst: 11 February 1790
- Generalmajor (Major General: 11 October 1794 '(effective 1 May 1794)
- Feldmarschalleutnant (Lieutenant Field Marshal): 6 March 1800 (effective 9 September 1799)
- Retired: 26 December 1809

Military offices
Preceded by vacant	Proprietor (Inhaber) of Dragoon Regiment N°7 (subsequently N°2 after 1814); 1801–1814	Succeeded by

== Bibliography ==
- Smith, Digby. Hohenlohe-Ingelfingen. Leonard Kurdna and Digby Smith, compilers. A biographical dictionary of all Austrian Generals in the French Revolutionary and Napoleonic Wars, 1792-1815.]. At Napoleon Series, Robert Burnham, editor in chief. April 2008 version. Accessed 18 March 2010.
- Smith, Digby. Napoleonic Wars Databook: 1805. London: Greenhill Publishing Co., 1998, ISBN 1-85367-276-9.
