= August Gemünder =

German-born American violin maker (1814 – 1895)

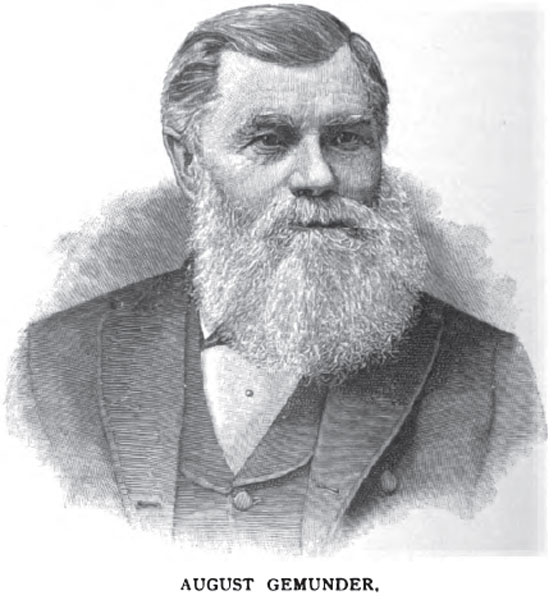

August Martin Ludwig Gemünder (22 March 1814 – 7 September 1895) was an American violin maker who worked in the United States. With his brother, luthier George Gemünder, and others, he pioneered the construction of quality violins in the United States.

== Biography ==
His father was a violin maker and repairer and Gemünder was brought up in the business—taking over the shop on his father's death. In 1839, he moved to Regensburg and resided in several other cities in Germany as well.

In 1846, he emigrated to Springfield, Massachusetts, in the United States. Later he established himself in Boston and then New York City. Gemünder specialized in copying old Italian masters, especially the instruments of Antonio Stradivarius, Joseph Guarnerius, and Paolo Maggini. In 1844 he was asked by a German violinist to make a violin that should not be an imitation, as to tone or any other quality, of the Italian masters. In executing the order, he succeeded in producing an instrument that he preserved as a model.

His violins were used by leading soloists, such as August Wilhelmj and Adolf Brodsky. Perhaps his greatest masterpiece was a celebrated copy of Sarasate's Amati, which that artist pronounced equal to the original. August's violins possessed a pure, even tone quality, responded easily, and were thought to excel in power the Italian instruments they were copied from. Gemünder contributed a series of articles to the trade journals, in which he discussed “Old and New Violins,” including a comparison of the tone of those instruments with the human voice; “The Cremona Secret,” a disquisition on the wood used in the manufacture of violins; “The Lost Secret and Common Sense,” with others on Italian varnish, violin construction, etc.

He worked at times in partnership with his brother George.
