= Hohenloh =

Hohenloh is a suburb in the city of Detmold, North Rhine-Westphalia, Germany, 1.6 km east-northeast of the centre of Detmold. It is located on the site of Hobart Barracks, a former military airfield, used before the war by the Luftwaffe and later by Allied Forces.

== History ==
Flughaven Detmold (Detmold Airport) was built in 1934 on the northeastern edge of the city and was intended for recreational (glider) flying only. Later it was decided to expand the airfield to allow it to be used as an emergency airfield by the Luftwaffe; the Luftwaffe took over the airfield in its entirety on 15 February 1935.

In April 1945, United States Army units moved through the area and seized the facilities. The airfield was used by the US Ninth Air Force and later by the 20th Armoured Brigade of the British Army of the Rhine and by RAF Harriers from nearby RAF Gütersloh.

The British turned the airfield over to German authorities in 1995. It was then necessary to construct the infrastructure for the new suburb of Hohenloh. New roads were built which also enabled better communication for the neighbouring suburb of Herberhausen. Retail outlets, for local retailers and for construction, gardening and furniture, were established. Many emigrants moved into the buildings vacated by the British, most of them from the former Soviet Union. New schools were built and land provided for newcomers who wished to build their own houses.

The airfield reopened in 1999.

== Coordinates ==
51°56′26″N 008°54′15″E
