= Koszęcin =

- Village
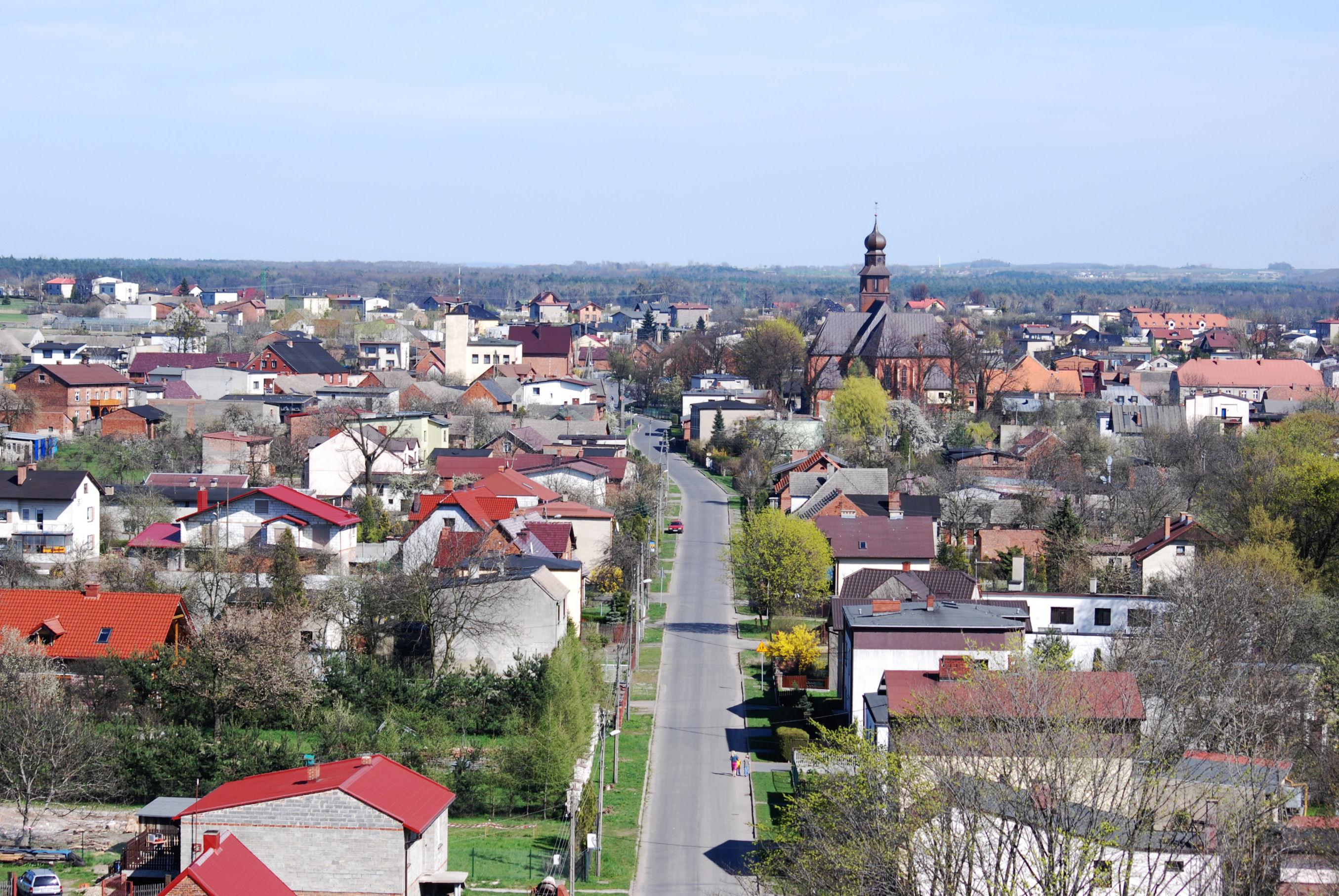
- View of the village

- Location within Poland
- Coordinates: 50°38′N 18°50′E
- Country: Poland
- Voivodeship: Silesian
- County: Lubliniec
- Gmina: Koszęcin
- First mentioned: 1277

Population (2006)
  - Total: 4,563
- Time zone: UTC+1 (CET)
  - Summer (DST): UTC+2 (CEST)
- Postal code: 42-286
- Area code: +48 35
- Car Plates: SLU
- Website: www.koszecin.info

Koszęcin [kɔˈʂɛnt͡ɕin] is a village in Lubliniec County, Silesian Voivodeship, in southern Poland. It is the seat of the gmina (administrative district) called Gmina Koszęcin.

== History ==
The village was first mentioned in 1277, when it was part of fragmented Piast-ruled Poland. Later on it passed to Bohemia (Czechia). In 1640, Koszęcin was bought by Fryderyk Blacha. It was annexed by Prussia in the 18th century, and from 1871 it was also part of Germany. It was the site of fights during the Polish Third Silesian Uprising against Germany in 1921, and afterwards it was reintegrated with Poland, which just regained independence following World War I.

It was occupied by Germany following the German-Soviet invasion of Poland, which started World War II in September 1939. The local police chief and three other Polish policemen from Koszęcin were murdered by the Russians in the Katyn massacre in 1940. The German occupiers operated the E416 forced labour subcamp of the Stalag VIII-B/344 prisoner-of-war camp in the village. After Germany's defeat in the war, in 1945, the village was restored to Poland.

It was previously in Częstochowa Voivodeship (1975–1998).

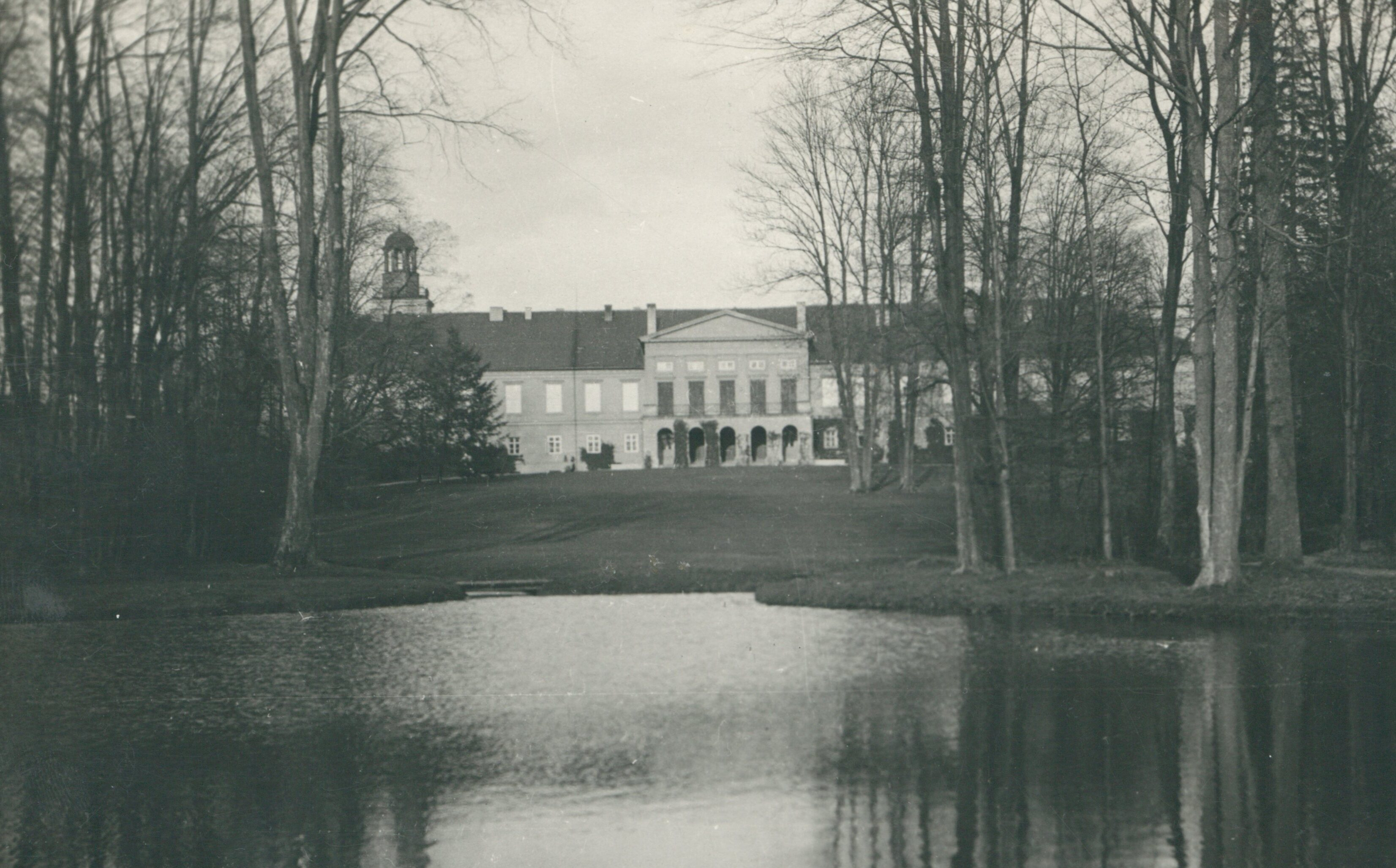
Koszęcin palace, before 1931

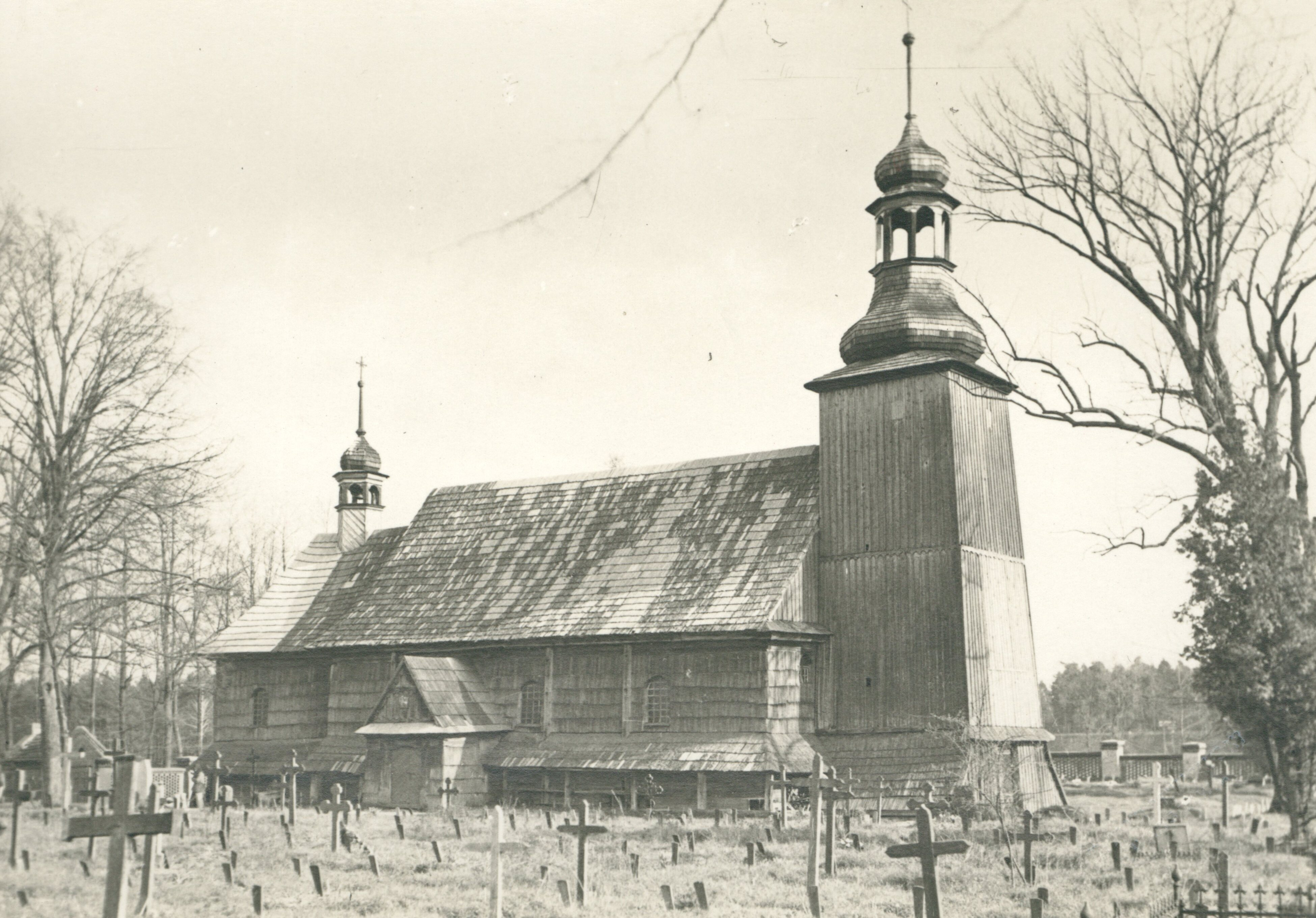
The church, ca 1932

== Sights and culture ==
There is a historic palace, former residence of the princes of Hohenlohe-Ingelfingen, and two heritage churches (Holy Trinity church and Sacred Heart church) in the village. A Culture Center is located in Koszęcin. The Koszęcin radio transmitter is located nearby.

== Transport ==
Koszęcin is located at the intersection of the Voivodeship roads 906 and 907, and there is also a train station.

== Gallery ==
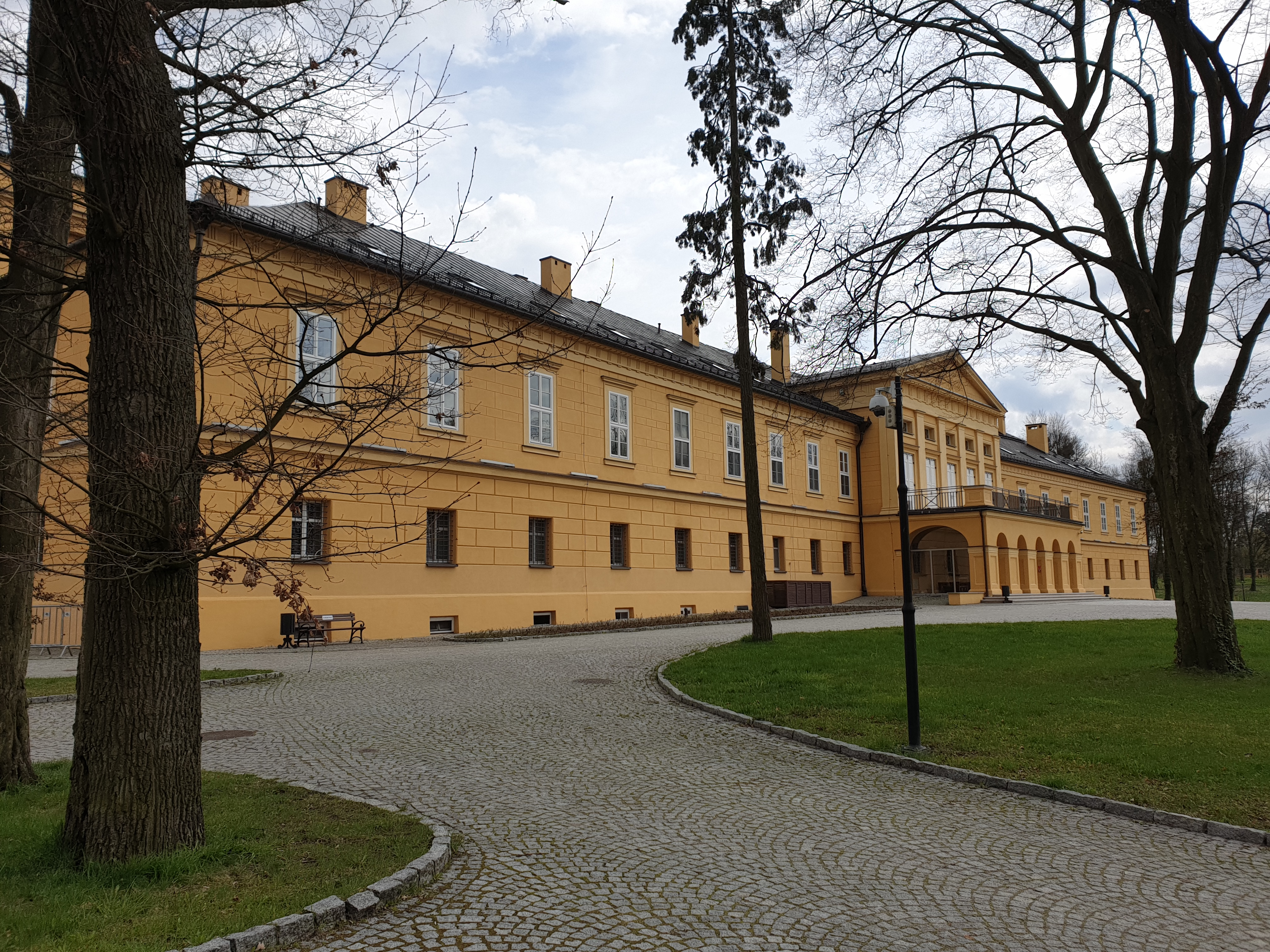
Palace

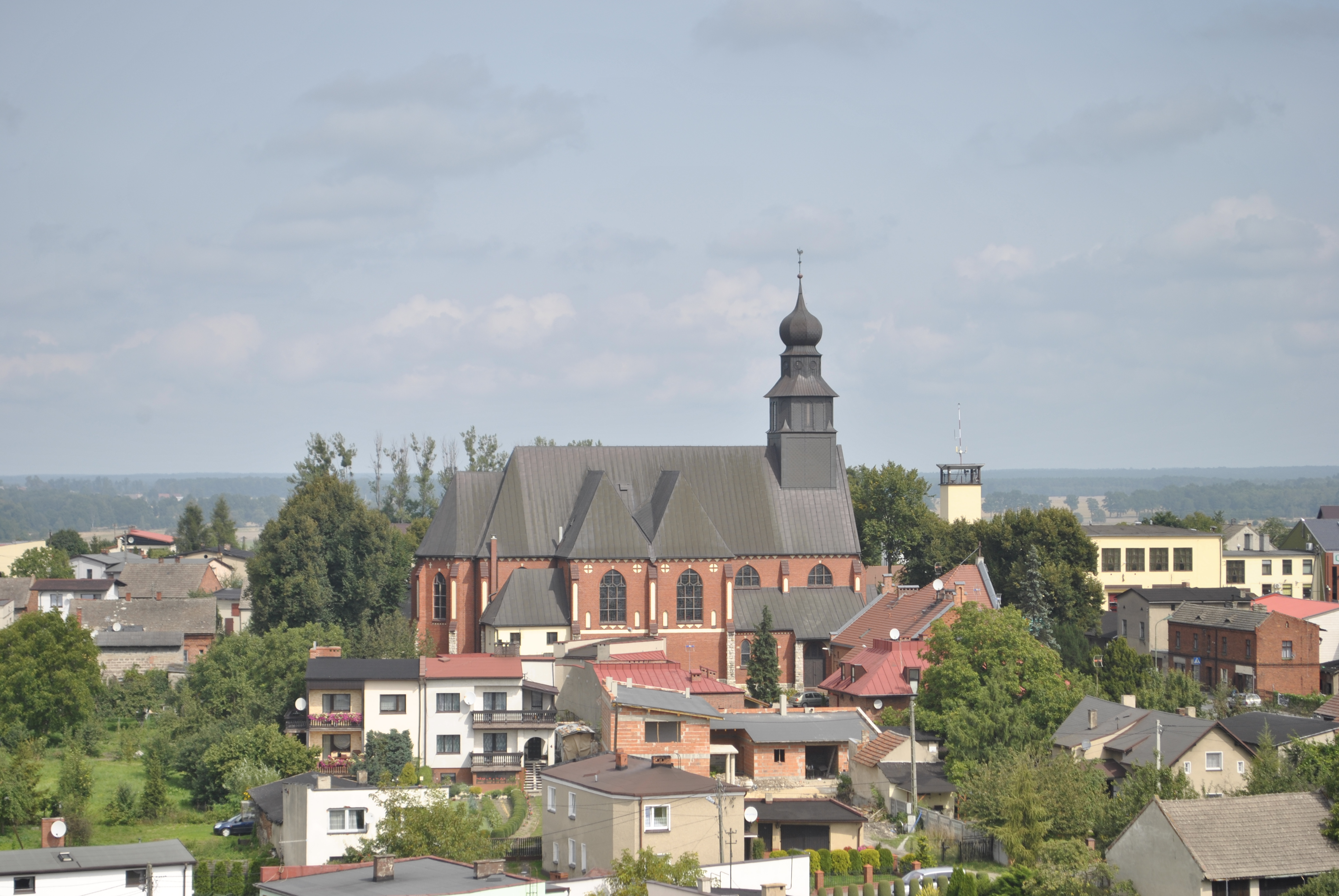
Sacred Heart church

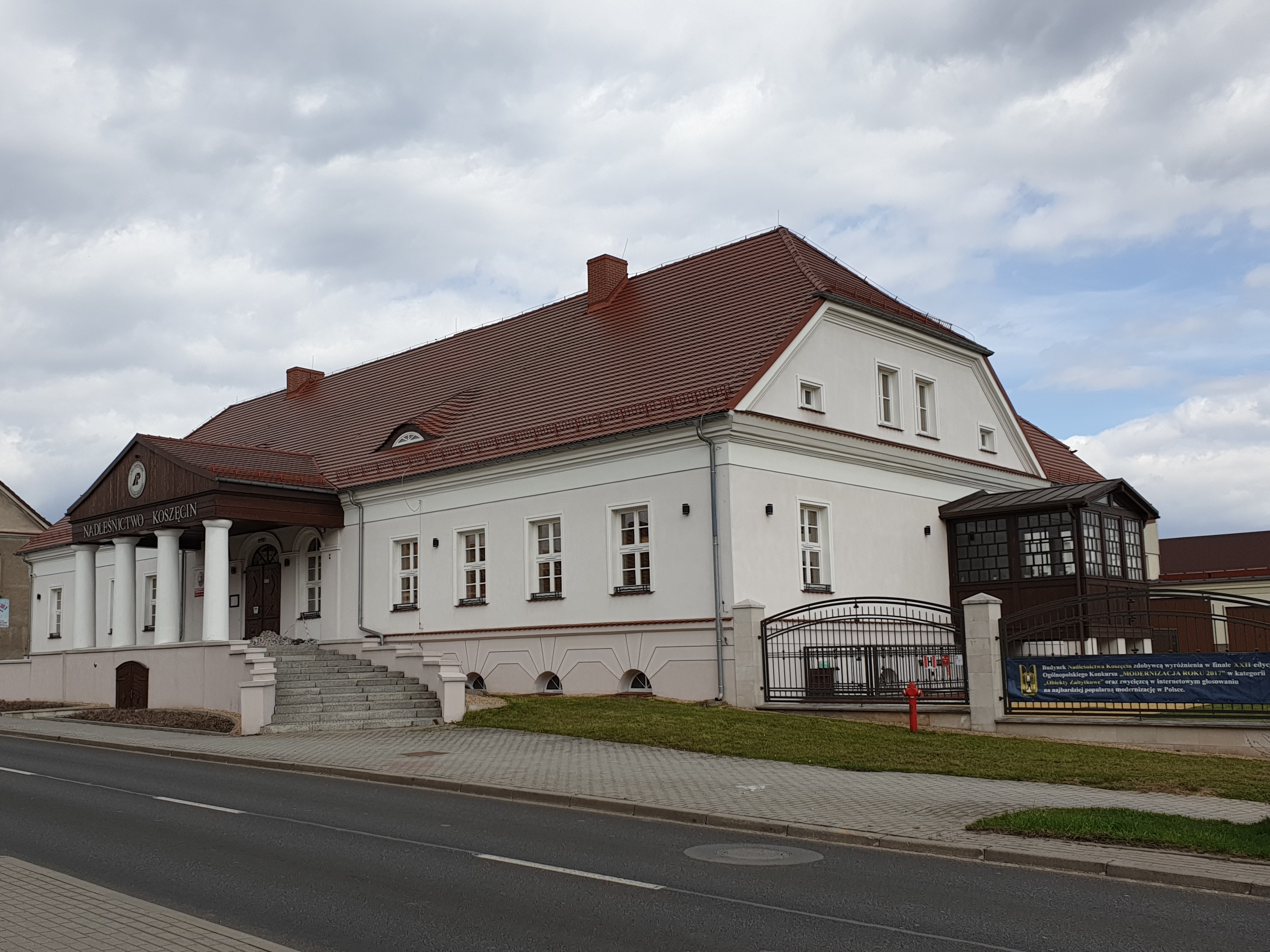
Forestry

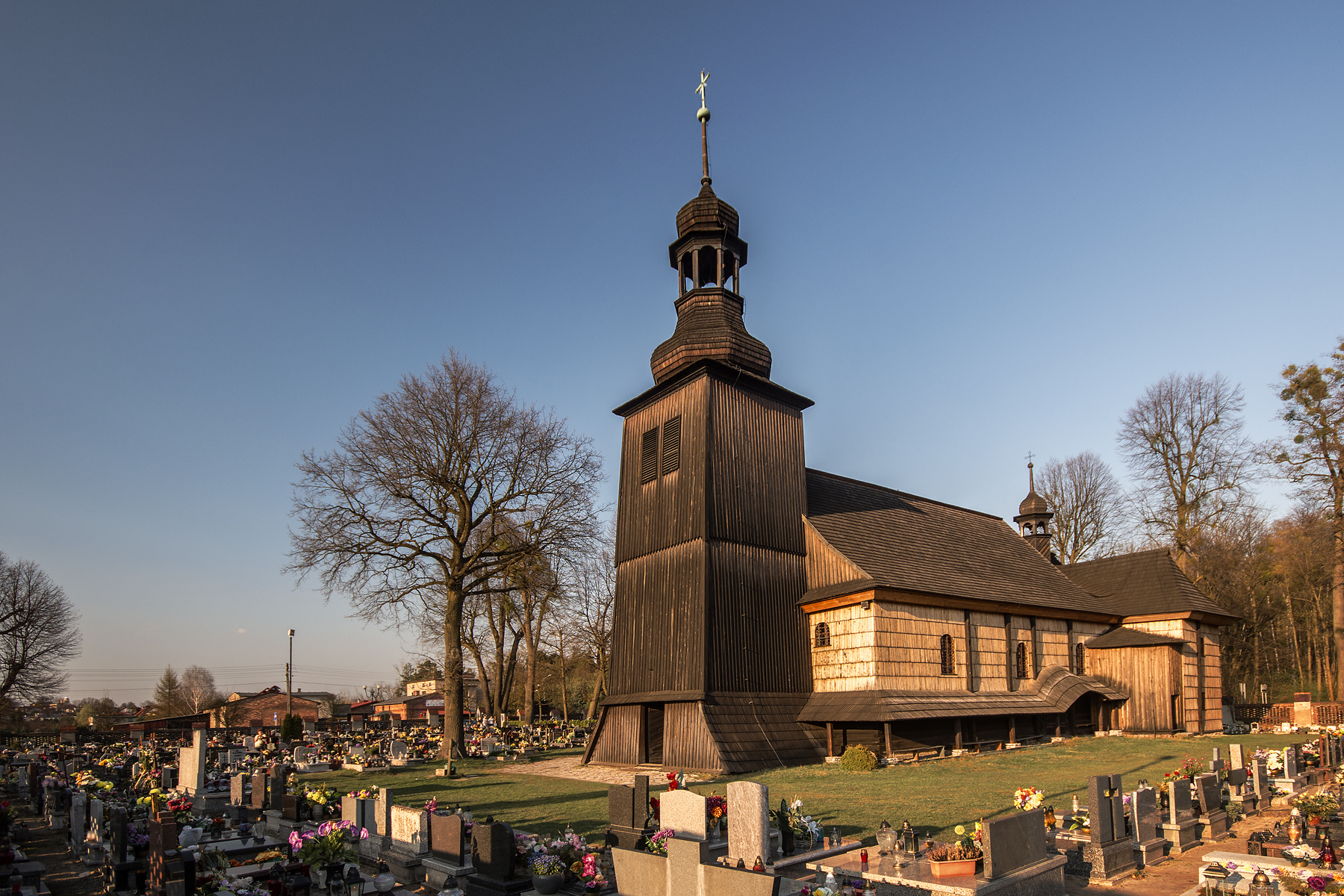
Holy Trinity church

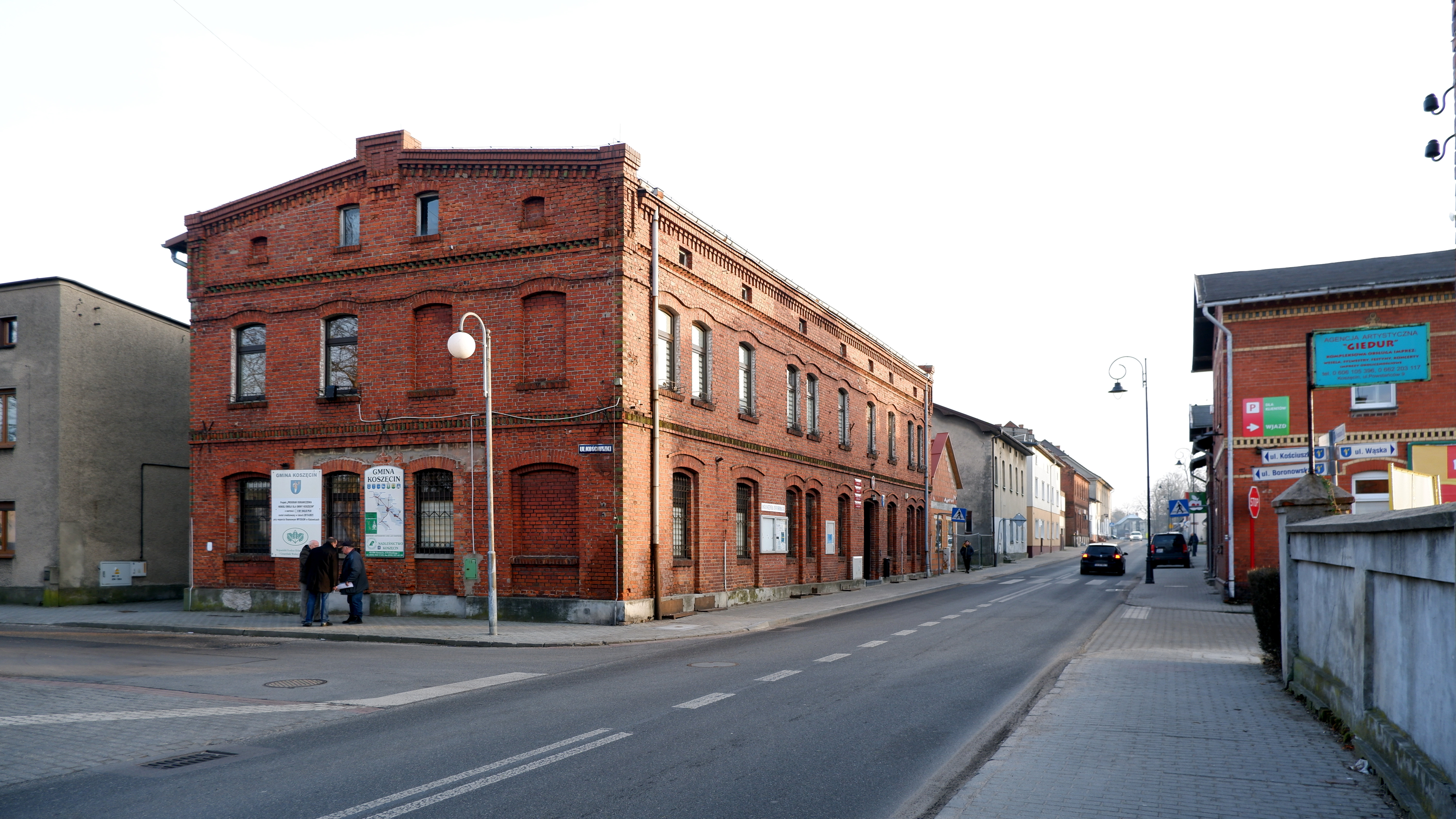
Municipal office
