= Hohenlohe-Ingelfingen =

Coordinates: 49.3058°N 9.6554°E

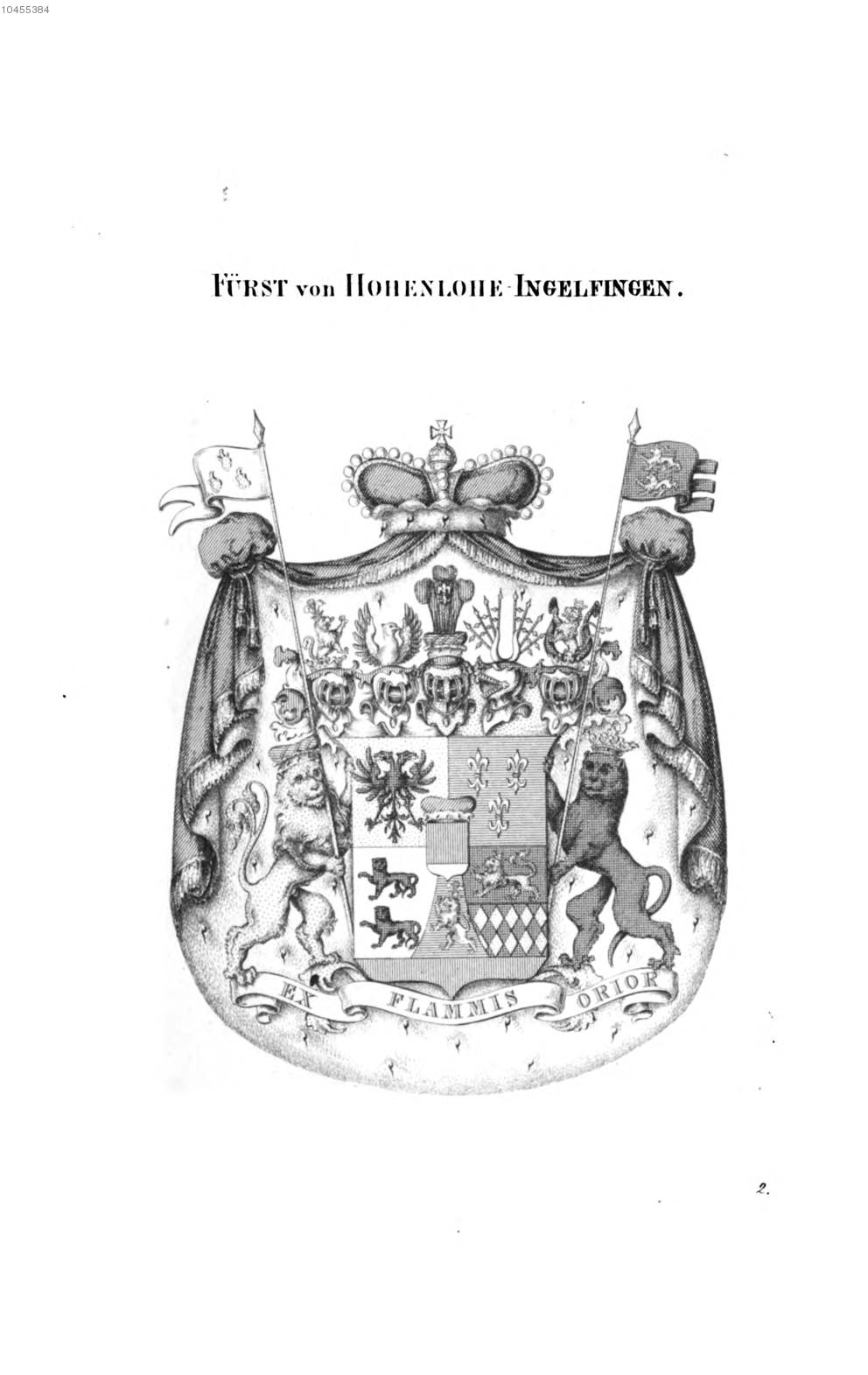
Coat of Arms of Princes von Hohenlohe-Ingelfingen

Hohenlohe-Ingelfingen was a German County and later Principality of the House of Hohenlohe, located in northeastern Baden-Württemberg, Germany, around Ingelfingen. Hohenlohe-Ingelfingen was a scion of Hohenlohe-Langenburg. It was raised from a County to a Principality in 1764, and was mediatised to Württemberg in 1806. In the 19th and 20th century, the princes lived at Schloss Koschentin.

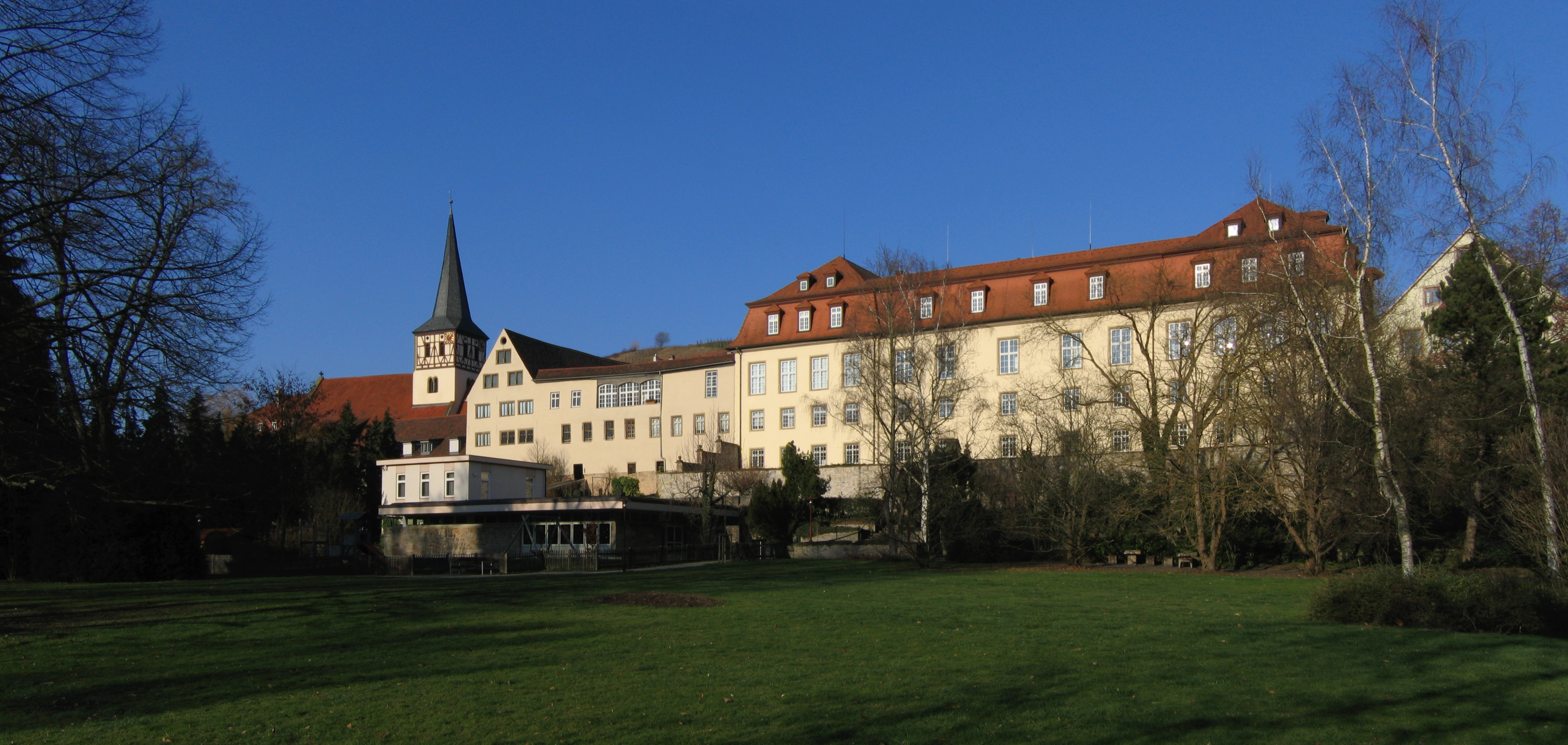
Ingelfingen Castle

== Counts of Hohenlohe-Ingelfingen (1701–1764) ==
- Christian Kraft, Count of Hohenlohe-Langenburg, from 1701 to 1743
- Philip Henry (died 1781), Count from 1743 to 1764

== Princes of Hohenlohe-Ingelfingen (1764–1806) ==
- Philip Henry (died 1781), prince from 1764 to 1781
- Henry Augustus (died 1796), prince from 1781 to 1796
- Frederick Louis (1746–1818), prince from 1796 to 1806, resigned in favour of his son:
  - Adolf Karl Friedrich Ludwig (1797–1873) who held the title for less than a year before the principality was mediatized under Württemberg suzerainty.

== Post-mediatization ==
- Friedrich Karl Wilhelm, Fürst zu Hohenlohe-Ingelfingen (1752–1814)
