= Friedrich Ludwig, Prince of Hohenlohe-Ingelfingen =

Prussian general (1746–1818)

Frederick Louis
- Prince of Hohenlohe-Ingelfingen
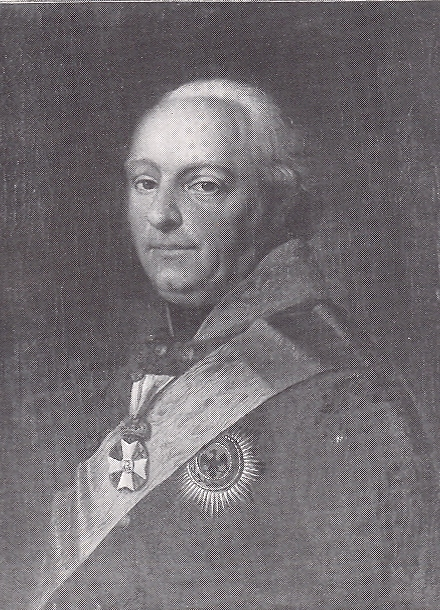
- Frederick Louis, Prince of Hohenlohe-Ingelfingen
- Born: 31 January 1746
- Died: 15 February 1818 (aged 72); Slawentzitz, Upper Silesia
- Noble family: House of Hohenlohe-Ingelfingen
- Spouse: Countess Amalie von Hoym
- Issue: August, Prince of Hohenlohe-Öhringen; Prince Adolf zu Hohenlohe-Ingelfingen
- Father: Heinrich August, 1.Fürst zu Hohenlohe-Ingelfingen
- Mother: Countess Wilhelmine Eleonore of Hohenlohe-Oehringen

Frederick Louis, Prince of Hohenlohe-Ingelfingen (German: Friedrich Ludwig Fürst zu Hohenlohe-Ingelfingen) (31 January 1746 – 15 February 1818) was a Prussian general.

== Early life ==
Frederick Louis was the eldest son of Henry August, Prince of Hohenlohe-Ingelfingen (1715-1796) and his wife, Wilhelmine Eleonore of Hohenlohe-Neuenstein-Öhringen (1717-1794). His grandfather, Christian Kraft, was a younger son of Henry Frederick, Count of Hohenlohe-Langenburg

== Biography ==
He began his military career as a boy, serving against the Prussians in the last years of the Seven Years' War. Entering the Prussian army after the peace, he was, as a result of his princely rank, at once made a major; and in 1775 he was elevated to lieutenant-colonel. In 1778 Frederick Louis took part in the War of the Bavarian Succession and at about the same time was made a colonel. Shortly before the death of King Frederick the Great, he was promoted to the rank of major general and appointed Chief of a Regiment. For some years the prince did garrison duty at Breslau, until in 1791 he was made governor of Berlin. In 1794 he commanded a corps in the Prussian army on the Rhine and distinguished himself greatly in many engagements, particularly in the Battle of Kaiserslautern on 20 September.

Frederick Louis was at this time the most popular soldier in the Prussian army. Blücher wrote of him that he was a leader of whom the Prussian army might well be proud. He succeeded his father in the principality, and acquired additional lands by his marriage with a daughter of Count von Hoym. In 1806 Frederick Louis, now a general of infantry, was appointed to command the left wing of the Prussian forces opposing Napoleon, having under him Prince Louis Ferdinand of Prussia; but, feeling that his career had been that of a prince and not that of a professional soldier, he allowed his quartermaster-general, the incompetent Oberst (Colonel) Christian Karl August Ludwig von Massenbach to influence him unduly. Disputes soon broke out between Hohenlohe and the commander-in-chief the Duke of Brunswick, the armies marched hither and thither without effective results, and finally Frederick Louis's army was almost destroyed by Napoleon at the Battle of Jena on 14 October 1806.

The prince displayed his usual personal bravery in the battle, and managed to rally a portion of his corps near Erfurt, whence he retreated into Prussia. But the pursuers followed him up closely and Marshal Joachim Murat intercepted his corps at Prenzlau. On the morning of 28 October, a fortnight after Jena and three weeks after the beginning of hostilities, Hohenlohe refused two French demands that he surrender. However, the initial fighting went against the Prussians in the Battle of Prenzlau. Massenbach, who had gone to negotiate with the French, suddenly turned up with the news that the French completely surrounded them, which was untrue. Influenced by his chief of staff and assured by Murat "on his honour" that 100,000 French had encircled his forces, Hohenlohe capitulated with 10,000 men (in fact, Murat had no more than 12,000 near Prenzlau, including only 3,000 infantry).

Frederick Louis's former popularity and influence in the army had now the worst possible effect, for the commandants of garrisons everywhere lost heart and followed his example. The capitulation of Pasewalk occurred on 29 October, the capitulation of Stettin on the night of 29–30 October, and Küstrin surrendered on 1 November. Before the month of November was over, the Siege of Magdeburg ended in a capitulation. West of the Elbe River, the Sieges of Hameln, Nienburg, and Plassenburg also ended badly for Prussia.

After two years spent as a prisoner-of-war in France, Frederick Louis retired to Sławięcice Palace (Schloss Slawentzitz) and its estates, living in self-imposed obscurity until his death. He had, in August 1806, just before the outbreak of the War of the Fourth Coalition, resigned the principality to his eldest son, not being willing to become a mediatized ruler under Württemberg suzerainty.

== Marriage and issue ==
On 8 April 1782 in Gleina, he married Countess Marie Amalie Christiane Charlotte Luise Anna von Hoym (1763-1840), daughter Count Julius Gebhard von Hoym (d. 1769) and his wife, Christiane Charlotte von Dieskau, later Princess von der Osten-Sacken (1733-1811). They had:

- Prince August of Hohenlohe-Ingelfingen; he married Louise of House of Württemberg (1789-1851) and had issue
- Princess Adelheid of Hohenlohe-Ingelfingen (1787-1858), she married Prince Georg Ludwig Moritz of Hohenlohe-Kirchberg (1786-1836), no issue
- Princess Emilie of Hohenlohe-Ingelfingen (1788-1859), she married Count Albrech August Ludwig of Erbach-Fürstenau (1787-1851) and had issue
- Prince Wilhelm Ludwig Eduard of Hohenlohe-Ingelfingen (1789-1790)
- Princess Auguste of Hohenlohe-Ingelfingen (1793-1821), she married Charles, Landgrave of Hesse-Philippsthal-Barchfeld and had issue
- Prince Ludwig Karl of Hohenlohe-Ingelfingen (1794-1794)
- Prince Adolf of Hohenlohe-Ingelfingen, married Princess Luise of Hohenlohe-Langenburg (1799-1881) and had issue
- Prince Alexander of Hohenlohe-Ingelfingen (1798-1829)

== Death ==
Frederick Louis died in Slawentzitz in Upper Silesia in 1818. He was succeeded by his sons August, Prince of Hohenlohe-Öhringen and Prince Adolf zu Hohenlohe-Ingelfingen.

== Ancestry ==
Ancestors of Friedrich Ludwig, Prince of Hohenlohe-Ingelfingen

8. Heinrich Friedrich, Count of Hohenlohe-Langenburg
4. Christian Kraft, Count of Hohenlohe-Ingelfingen
9. Countess Maria Katharina of Hohenlohe-Waldenburg
2. Heinrich August, Prince of Hohenlohe-Ingelfingen
10. Count Hiskias of Hohenlohe-Pfedelbach
5. Countess Maria Katharina of Hohenlohe-Pfedelbach
11. Countess Dorothea Elisabeth of Hohenlohe-Waldenburg
1. Friedrich Ludwig, Prince of Hohenlohe-Ingelfingen
12. Johann Friedrich I of Hohenlohe-Öhringen
6. Johann Friedrich II of Hohenlohe-Öhringen
13. Princess Luise Amöne of Schleswig-Holstein-Norburg
3. Countess Wilhelmine Eleonore of Hohenlohe-Öhringen
14. Ernest Louis, Landgrave of Hesse-Darmstadt
7. Landgravine Dorothea Sophie of Hessen-Darmstadt
15. Princess Dorothea Charlotte of Brandenburg-Ansbach
