= Johann Heinrich von Schmitt =

Austrian army commander (1743–1805)

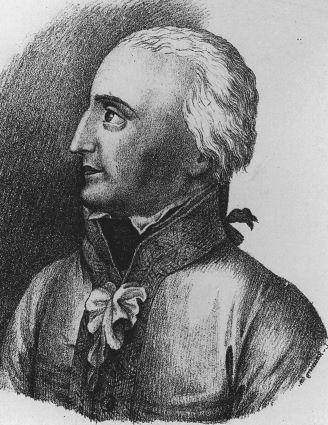
- Johann Heinrich von Schmitt, after his retirement in 1800. Copperplate engraving by Blasius Höfel (1792–1863)
- Born: 1743; Pest, Hungary, or Bavaria
- Died: 11 November 1805 (aged 61–62) Dürenstein, Austria 48°23′14″N 15°31′13″E
- Allegiance: Habsburg Monarchy
- Branch: Chief of the Quartermaster General Staff of the Army
- Service years: 1761–1800; November 1805 †
- Rank: Feldmarshalleutnant
- Conflicts: French Revolutionary Wars; War of the Third Coalition

Johann Heinrich von Schmitt (1743 – 11 November 1805) was an officer in the Army of the Holy Roman Empire. He was arguably one of the most successful chiefs of staff; he rose to the rank of Feldmarshalleutnant during the French Revolutionary and Napoleonic wars. However, he was criticized as a tactician on a battlefield.

He developed a sound military reputation as a surveyor, map-maker, and strategist during Austria's wars with the Ottoman Empire. He served on the Quartermaster's staff during the War of the First Coalition. He was the mastermind behind the Rhine Campaign of 1796. As a major general, he was one of Archduke Charles' trusted advisers during the War of the Second Coalition campaign in southwestern Germany.

In 1799, his reputation was tarnished by the assassination of the French delegates to the Congress of Rastatt, but his complicity was not proven. In a letter to Emperor Francis II of 18 May 1799, Archduke Charles, Duke of Teschen, tried to blame him to some extent for issuing an injudicious order to seize the diplomats' papers and their relationship soured. He retired the following year due to conflicts with the new commander in chief of the Habsburg army, Paul Kray. When war broke out again in 1805, he was recalled from retirement and assigned to the combined Russian-Austrian forces on the Danube. On 11 November, Schmitt was killed by friendly fire at the Battle of Dürenstein, where his disposition of the Allied troops led to an indecisive outcome, despite Allied numerical superiority. Schmitt's disposition for this battle ignored moral categories, was excessively complex and did not take into account such considerations as possible disruptions in the advance of columns, the poor quality of roads, the difficulty in the absence of modern means of communication, and the control of scattered units. Mikhail Kutuzov was more of a strategist than a tactician, so he decided to rely on Schmitt's intelligence, who knew the area.

== Family and education ==
Johann Heinrich von Schmitt was born in 1743, the son of Johann Sebastian von Schmitt, a Rittmeister (cavalry captain) in the Imperial Cuirassier Regiment Graf Cordova. Schmitt may have been born in Pest (Budapest) in Hungary, or, as other sources claim, in Bavaria. In 1742–1743, during the War of Austrian Succession, his father's regiment participated in the Battle of Sahay (Zahájí in Bohemia), and then in the siege of Prague, followed by duty in Bavaria and the Rhineland in 1743. His father died in 1752—it is unclear where—and on 25 June 1758, at the age of 14 years, Schmitt enrolled in the Imperial School of Engineering in Gumpendorf. There he received a thorough technical training in engineering, plus the education provided for officers on all other major subjects, particularly those pertaining to war and science.

After three years, on 15 November 1761, Schmitt received a commission as a Fähnrich (ensign) in Infanterie-Regiment Nr. 15 Pallavicini. During his assignment with this regiment, he saw service in the last years of the Seven Years' War (1756–1763) in the Bohemian theatre. The lack of accurate maps had hampered the conduct of the Seven Years' War and, in 1764, Schmitt was assigned to a project to improve the map-making capacity of the military. The idea of the scientific soldier, or a soldier educated in the specifics of military operations, led to an investment in the training and education of officers. He and his mentor, Carlos Pallavicini, were at the forefront of this movement, particularly in the development of map-making. On 1 February 1769, after proving himself capable in this assignment, he was promoted to Oberleutnant (lieutenant) and transferred to the reorganized General-Quartermaster staff.

== Military career ==
From 1769 to 1778, Schmitt was assigned to the military frontier, the border region of the Habsburg and Ottoman empires, and was especially active in Temesvar, in the Banat, bordering the Ottoman Empire. In 1778, he was promoted to captain and mobilized against Prussia during the short War of the Bavarian Succession, after which he transferred back to the Balkan border areas where he stayed until 1782. His thorough knowledge of the countryside guaranteed him map-making and intelligence assignments in Turkish-occupied Bosnia to gather information in preparation for an upcoming campaign. In particular, he developed material on the Ottoman military situation. His work developing intelligence of Turkish strength in Osijek and Alt Gradiska satisfied his superiors and when the war actually broke out in 1787, he was assigned to the General Staff of the Slavonion Corps. He participated in the storming of the fortress at Šabac, in Serbia, on 24 April 1788. Emperor Joseph II promoted him personally to major on 14 May 1788. In 1789, Schmitt fought at the siege of Belgrade, and on 23 February 1790, he was promoted to lieutenant colonel. In March 1790, he transferred to Bohemia, under command of Field Marshal Ernst Gideon von Laudon, for anticipated action against the Kingdom of Prussia. When this war came to naught, he was transferred to the Austrian Netherlands in 1791, to help contain a local uprising.

Promotions

- Leutnant: 1 February 1769
- Hauptmann: 23 March 1778
- Major: 14 May 1788
- Oberstleutnant: 23 February 1790 (effective 14 February 1790)
- Oberst: 3 September 1793
- Generalmajor: 6 September 1796 (effective 10 June 1796)
- Feldmarshalleutnant: 1 March 1800 (effective 2 March 1800)
- Retired: 18 August 1800
- Reactivated: November 1805

=== Service in the French Revolutionary Wars ===
At the outbreak of the War of the First Coalition between the Habsburg monarchy and revolutionary France in April 1792, Schmitt was a staff officer in the main Imperial army in the Austrian Netherlands. He distinguished himself in the defense of the pass of the Croix-aux-Bois (14 September 1792) and in the battles of Raismes and Vicoigne on 8 May 1793. On 3 September 1793, after his promotion to colonel, he served under Field Marshal Prince Josias of Saxe-Coburg-Saalfeld. In the autumn of 1794, Schmitt organized the retreat of the main Imperial Army, now under the command of Coburg's successor, Feldzeugmeister Count Clerfayt, from their untenable positions in the Austrian Netherlands eastward to the Rhine.

In April 1796, still serving under Field Marshal Count Clerfayt, he was appointed to the staff of Archduke Charles by Emperor Francis II. With his deputy, Anton Mayer von Heldensfeld, Schmitt planned the 1796 campaign, which, after several initial setbacks, produced the Imperial victories at the Battle of Amberg (24 August 1796) and the Battle of Würzburg (2 September 1796), and resulted in the French retreat to the west shore of the Rhine. He was promoted to Generalmajor on 6 September 1796.

Schmitt's tenure as chief of staff was briefly interrupted in 1799 when he was connected, by rumour at least, to the 29 April assassination of the French delegates to the Congress of Rastatt. The assassination occurred as the delegation was leaving the city. The official investigation into the assassination placed so much pressure on Schmitt that he briefly resigned as Charles' Chief of Staff; he was never connected to the assassination and was reinstated. On 1 March 1800, Schmitt was promoted to Feldmarschallleutnant, but later in that year, Emperor Francis II replaced his brother, Archduke Charles, as commander in chief of the army. The 58-year-old Schmitt requested retirement, claiming he was tired and could no longer cope with the stress of the job, but the Emperor refused his request. The new commander, Field Marshal Pál Kray, retained Schmitt on his staff, but he seldom agreed with Kray's Quartermaster General, Generalmajor Johann Gabriel Chasteler de Courcelles, on any of the main issues facing the army; when Kray relied more on Chasteler than on Schmitt, Schmitt again requested retirement, which was again refused. On 19 August 1800, Francis II approved the petition when Kray seconded it. Schmitt went first to Vienna and then to Hoštice. There he lived with his friend Ferdinand Ritter von Geißlern until 1805.

=== Recall to active duty ===
During the War of the Third Coalition in 1805–1806, as one Austria's most capable chiefs of staff, Schmitt was called out of retirement for this specific task of organising the challenging Austro-Russian retreat. Equipped with a glowing letter of endorsement from Emperor Francis II to the Russian Infantry General Mikhail Illarionovich Kutuzov (1745–1813), Schmitt arrived at the Russian headquarters and was appointed Chief of the Quartermaster General Staff of the Allied Army. Schmitt met with the Russian forces at the great abbey of Melk, on the Danube, and he and the commanders developed a plan to encircle Édouard Mortier's French force near Dürenstein. To do so, they drew not only on their own military experience, but also called upon a captain from the region, to use his geographic and local knowledge.

=== Death at Dürenstein ===
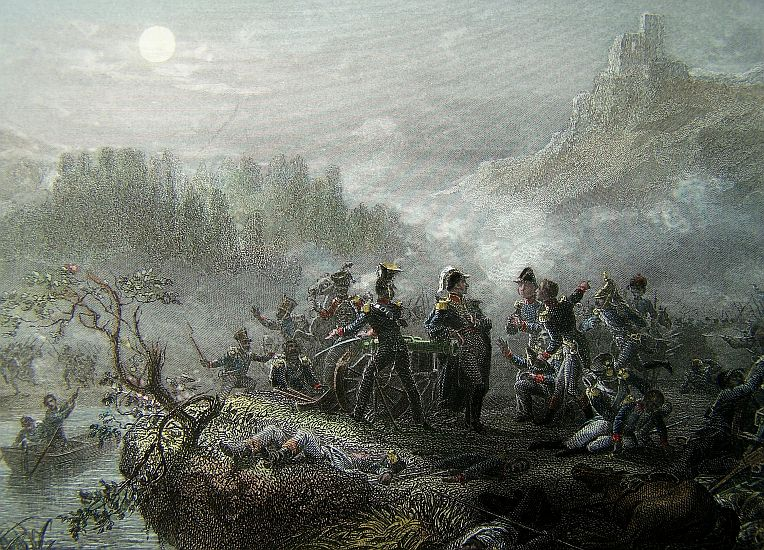
In the dark and confusion at the end of the battle, Schmitt was shot by Russian musketry. In this image, Marshal Mortier directs cannon fire on the Austrian and Russian lines.

Édouard Mortier had marched from Passau and Linz toward Vienna, traveling on the north bank of the Danube. His newly created VIII Corps, known as Corps Mortier, consisted of three divisions, which were stretched 56 kilometers (35 mi) apart along the river between Marbach and Dürenstein. This over-extension left his corps' northern flank unprotected, against Napoleon's specific instructions. Schmitt's plan capitalized on this mistake. On 11 November 1805, Kutuzov's column trapped one of Mortier's divisions, under command of Honoré Théodore Maxime Gazan de la Peyrière. The Russians used a ruse to entice Gazan into an attack on a small force, and then trapped him between two columns. The French were surrounded at the front and rear by the Russians, caught on the flood plain at Dürenstein. They could neither move forward nor backward. A second French division arrived in mid-afternoon and attacked the Russians in the flank, but were themselves surprised when Schmitt led an additional Russian column out of the mountains. Gazan's division lost over 40 percent of its men, as well as its colours, and several guns. The battle lasted well into the night. In its waning moments, the French were evacuating across the Danube in a flotilla of boats. In the confusion, Schmitt was shot, probably by Russian musketeers, in a field between the Waldstein and Heudürrgraben. Wilhelm von Kotzebue, a German in Russian service, later reported that the column came through the forest road and entered the main road on the river's edge; they immediately entered the cross-fire between Pierre Dupont's French forward posts of Dragoons and the Russian troops of Dmitry Dokhturov. He fell by Wadstein, and was buried on the battlefield with the dead of his Russian column. Although his burial site has never been found, a monument for him was erected in a park in nearby Krems in 1811.

== Assessment and legacy ==
When Napoleon's armies threatened Vienna in 1805, the Emperor called Schmitt out of retirement for the specific task of organizing the challenging Austro-Russian retreat. As Chief of the Quartermaster General Staff of the Army, of the Lower Rhine, the Rhine, and the Army of Germany, he had organised a variety of manoeuvres and battle plans, frequently hampered by difficult terrain. After Schmitt's death, Weyrother, the architect of the Austrian defeat at Hohenlinden, developed the general battle plan of the Allied action at Austerlitz. The military historian Digby Smith hypothesizes that Schmitt, an experienced officer and sound tactician, would have been more effective at the Battle of Austerlitz, at least more so than his replacement, Franz von Weyrother, as Chief of the Quartermaster General Staff of the Allied Army. In the long run, it was unlikely that Schmitt's plan would have changed the overall outcome—Austerlitz was arguably one of Napoleon's finest battles—but his battle plan would no doubt have been an improvement over the one the Allies used.

=== War and Peace ===
Schmitt is mentioned in Leo Tolstoy's novel War and Peace, Volume I, where several Austrian court officials and generals express grief at the news of his death at Dürenstein. Tolstoy has one of his characters, the diplomat Bilibin, call him "a general we all loved".

== Sources ==
=== Bibliography ===
- (in German) Ebert, Jens-Florian. Heinrich von Schmitt. Die Österreichischen Generäle 1792–1815. Napoleon Online. Accessed 23 January 2010.
- (in German) Egger, Ranier. Das Gefecht bei Dürnstein-Loiben 1805. Wien: Bundesverlag, 1986 (pamphlet) OCLC 500057034.
- Goetz, Robert. 1805: Austerlitz, the Destruction of the Third Coalition. Mechanicsburg, PA: Stackpole Books, 2005, ISBN 1-85367-644-6.
- Smith, Digby. Napoleonic Wars Databook: 1805, London: Greenhill Publishing Co., 1998, ISBN 1-85367-276-9.
- Smith, Digby. (Johann) Heinrich von Schmitt (S37) and Weyrother. Leopold Kudrna and Digby Smith (compilers). A Biographical Dictionary of all Austrian Generals in the French Revolutionary and Napoleonic Wars, 1792–1815. The Napoleon Series. Robert Burnham, editor in chief. April 2008 version. Accessed 23 January 2010.
- Sokolov, Oleg (2019). Битва трех императоров. Наполеон, Россия и Европа. 1799–1805 [The Battle of the Three Emperors. Napoleon, Russia and Europe. 1799–1805] (in Russian). Saint Petersburg: Piter. pp. 210–211. ISBN 978-5-4461-1047-6.
- (in German) Wrede, Alphons, Geschichte der K.u.K. Wehrmacht, vol. 3., Wien: Seidel u. Sohn, 1901.
