= Battle of Dürenstein =

1805 Napoleonic Wars battle

Battle of Dürnstein
- Part of the War of the Third Coalition
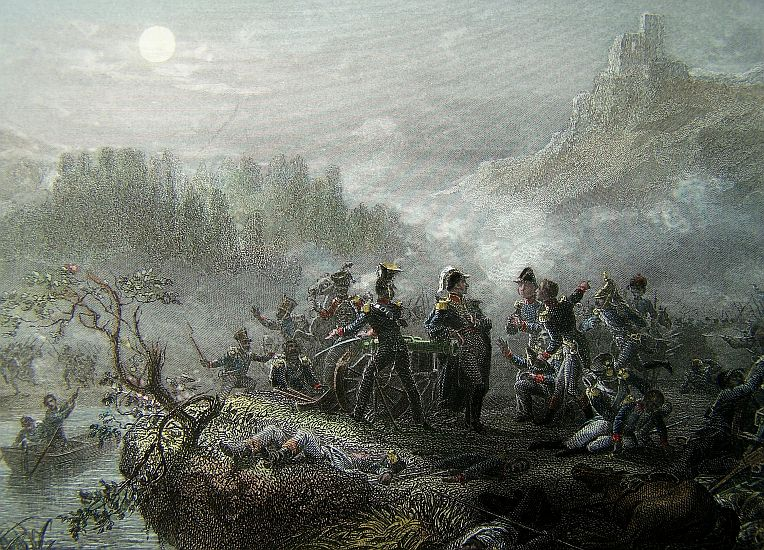
- Marshal Mortier at the battle of Durenstein in 1805, by Auguste Sandoz
Date	11 November 1805
Location	Dürenstein, Wachau, Austrian Empire 48°23′14″N 15°31′13″E
Result	See § Aftermath

Belligerents
France	Russia; Austria

Commanders and leaders
Édouard Mortier; Théodore Gazan; Pierre de l'Étang	Mikhail Kutuzov; Mikhail Miloradovich; Dmitry Dokhturov; Johann Schmitt †

Strength
approx. 14,000 (at end): 6,000 to 8,000 engaged	approx. 24,000: 10,500–12,000 engaged

Casualties and losses
2,500 to 6,600; See § Losses	2,000 to 4,000; See § Losses
- Location within Austria Battle of Dürenstein (Europe)

War of the Third Coalition:
Austria
current battle
Napoleon in command
Napoleon not in command

The Battle of Dürenstein (German: Schlacht bei Dürnstein; also known as Dürrenstein, Dürnstein and Diernstein) or the Battle of Krems (Russian: Сражение при Кремсе), on 11 November 1805, was an engagement in the Napoleonic Wars during the War of the Third Coalition. Dürenstein (modern Dürnstein), Austria, is located in the Wachau valley, on the river Danube, 73 kilometers (45 mi) upstream from Vienna, Austria. The river makes a crescent-shaped curve between Dürnstein and nearby Krems an der Donau, and the battle was fought in the flood plain between the river and the mountains.

At Dürenstein, a combined force of Russian and Austrian troops trapped a French division commanded by Théodore Maxime Gazan. The French division was part of the newly created VIII Corps, the so-called Corps Mortier, under command of Édouard Mortier. In pursuing the Austrian retreat from Bavaria, Mortier had over-extended his three divisions along the north bank of the Danube. Mikhail Kutuzov, commander of the Coalition force, enticed Mortier to send Gazan's division into a trap and French troops were caught in a valley between two Russian columns. They were rescued by the timely arrival of a second division, under command of Pierre Dupont de l'Étang. The battle extended well into the night, after which both sides claimed victory. The French lost more than a third of their participants, and Gazan's division experienced over 40 percent losses. The Austrians and Russians also had heavy losses—close to 16 percent—but perhaps the most significant was the death in action of Johann Heinrich von Schmitt, one of Austria's most capable chiefs of staff.

The battle was fought three weeks after the surrender of one Austrian army at the Battle of Ulm and three weeks before the Russo-Austrian defeat at the Battle of Austerlitz. After Austerlitz, Austria withdrew from the war. The French demanded a high indemnity, and Francis II abdicated as Holy Roman Emperor, releasing the German states from their allegiance to the Holy Roman Empire.

== Background ==
In a series of conflicts in 1803–15 known as the Napoleonic Wars, various European powers formed five coalitions against the First French Empire. Like the wars sparked by the French Revolution (1789), these further revolutionized the formation, organization and training of European armies and led to an unprecedented militarization, mainly due to mass conscription. Under the leadership of Napoleon, French power rose quickly as the Grande Armée conquered most of Europe, and collapsed rapidly after the disastrous invasion of Russia in 1812. Napoleon's empire ultimately suffered complete military defeat in the 1813–14 campaigns, resulting in the restoration of the Bourbon monarchy in France. Although Napoleon made a spectacular return in 1815, known as the Hundred Days, his defeat at the Battle of Waterloo, the pursuit of his army and himself, his abdication and banishment to the Island of Saint Helena concluded the Napoleonic Wars.

== Danube campaign ==
Combatants of the Third Coalition
Coalition Allies	French Empire & Allies
Austria; Russia; United Kingdom (Kingdom of the Two Sicilies) Naples and Sicily; Portugal; Sweden	France; Batavian Republic (Kingdom of Italy (Napoleonic)) Italy (Kingdom of Italy (Napoleonic)) Etruria; Spain; Bavaria; Württemberg

During 1803–06 the Third Coalition fought the First French Empire and its client states (see table at right). Although several naval battles determined control of the seas, the outcome of the war was decided on the continent, predominantly in two major land operations in the Danube valley: the Ulm campaign in the upper Danube and the Vienna campaign, in the middle Danube valley.

Political conflicts in Vienna delayed Austria's entry into the Third Coalition until 1805. After hostilities of the War of the Second Coalition ended in 1801, Archduke Charles—the emperor's brother—took advantage of the subsequent years of peace to develop a military restructuring plan. He carefully put this plan into effect beginning in 1803–04, but implementation was incomplete in 1805 when Karl Mack, Lieutenant Field Marshal and Quartermaster-General of the Army, implemented his own restructuring. Mack bypassed Charles' methodical approach. Occurring in the field, Mack's plan also undermined the overall command and organizational structure. Regardless, Mack sent an enthusiastic report to Vienna on the military's readiness. Furthermore, after misreading Napoleon's maneuvers in Württemberg, Mack reported to Vienna on the weakness of French dispositions. His reports convinced the war party advising the emperor, Francis II, to enter the conflict against France, despite Charles' own advice to the contrary. Responding to the report and rampant anti-French fever in Vienna, Francis dismissed Charles from his post as generalissimo and appointed his Francophobic brother-in-law, Archduke Ferdinand, as commander.

The inexperienced Ferdinand was a poor choice of replacement for the capable Charles, having neither maturity nor aptitude for the assignment. Although Ferdinand retained nominal command, day-to-day decisions were placed in the hands of Mack, equally ill-suited for such an important assignment. When Mack was wounded early in the campaign, he was unable to take full charge of the army. Consequently, command further devolved to Lieutenant Field Marshal Karl Philipp, Prince of Schwarzenberg, an able cavalry officer but inexperienced in the command of such a large army.

=== Road to Ulm ===
The campaign in the upper Danube valley began in October, with several clashes in Swabia. Near the Bavarian town of Wertingen, 40 kilometers (25 mi) northwest of Augsburg, on 8 October the 1st Regiment of dragoons, part of Murat's Reserve Cavalry Corps, and grenadiers of Lannes' V Corps surprised an Austrian force half its size. The Austrians were arrayed in a line and unable to form their defensive squares quickly enough to protect themselves from the 4,000 dragoons and 8,000 grenadiers. Nearly 3,000 Austrians were captured and over 400 were killed or wounded. A day later, at another small town, Günzburg—immediately south of the Danube river—the French 59th Regiment of the Line stormed a bridge over the Danube and, humiliatingly, chased two large Austrian columns toward Ulm.

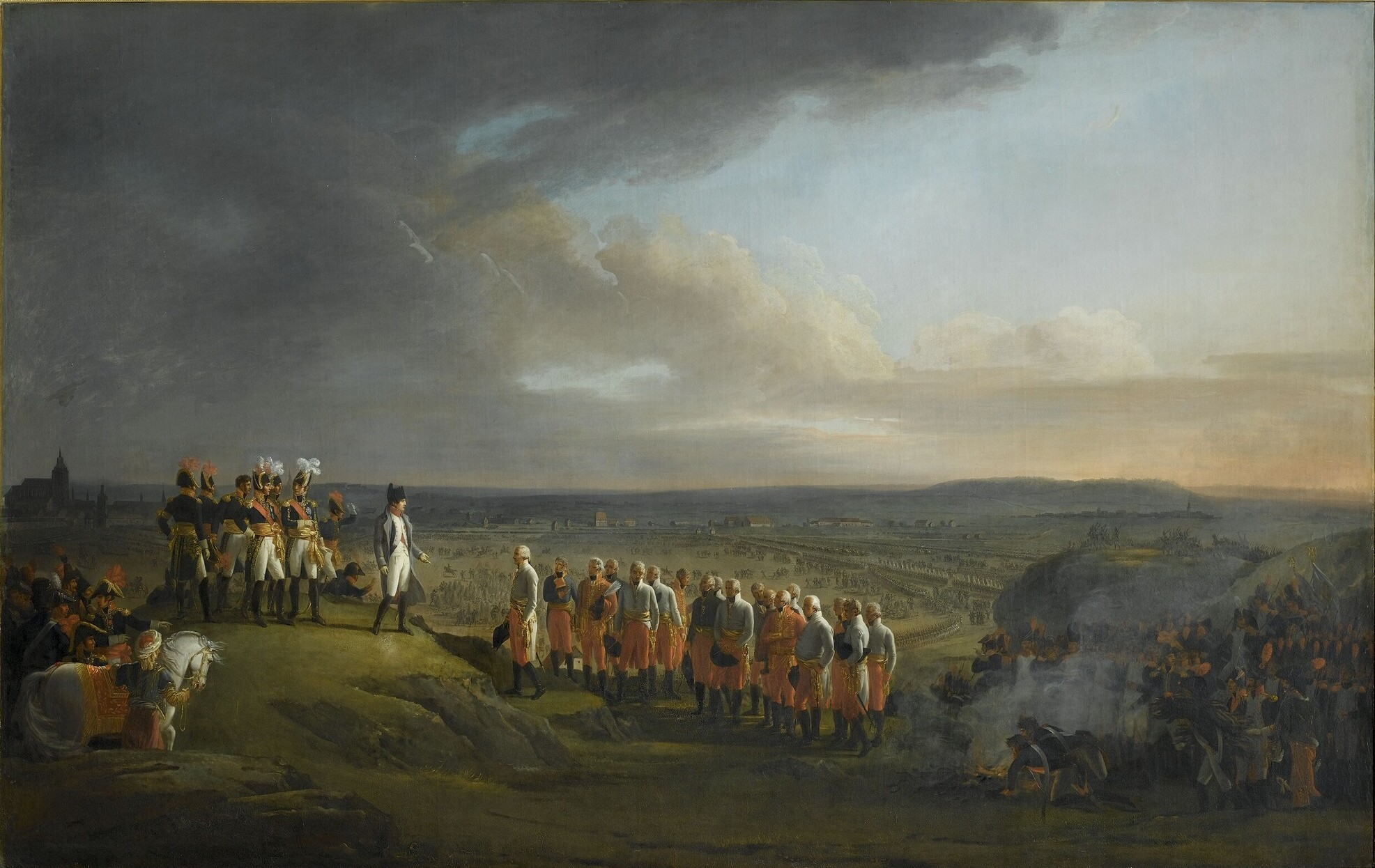
Gen. Mack and his staff surrender the Ulm fortress. Painting by René Théodore Berthon

The campaign was not entirely bad news for Vienna. At Haslach, Johann von Klenau arranged his 25,000 infantry and cavalry in a prime defensive position and, on 11 October, the overly confident General of Division Pierre Dupont de l'Étang attacked Klenau's force with fewer than 8,000 men. The French lost 1,500 men killed and wounded. Aside from taking the Imperial Eagles and guidons of the 15th and 17th Dragoons, Klenau's force also captured 900 men, 11 guns and 18 ammunition wagons.

Klenau's victory was the singular success. On 14 October Mack sent two columns out of Ulm in preparation for a breakout to the north: one under Johann Sigismund Riesch headed toward Elchingen to secure the bridge there, and the other under Franz von Werneck went north with most of the heavy artillery. Recognizing the opportunity, Marshal Michel Ney hurried the rest of his VI Corps forward to re-establish contact with Dupont, who was still north of the Danube. In a two-pronged attack Ney sent one division to the south of Elchingen on the right bank of the Danube. This division began the assault at Elchingen. At the same time another division crossed the river to the east and moved west against Riesch's position. After clearing Austrian pickets from a bridge, the French attacked and captured a strategically located abbey at the top of the hill at bayonet point. The Austrian cavalry unsuccessfully tried to fend off the French, but the Austrian infantry broke and ran. In this engagement alone, the Austrians lost more than half their reserve artillery park, 6,000 (out of 8,000 total participants) dead, wounded or captured and four colors. Reisch's column also failed to destroy the bridges across the Danube.

Napoleon's lightning campaign exposed the Austrian indecisive command structure and poor supply apparatus. Mack completely misread the French dispositions and scattered his forces; as the French defeated each unit separately, the surviving Austrians withdrew toward the Ulm fortifications. Napoleon arrived to take personal command of close to 80,000 men. At Ulm on 16 October Karl Mack surrendered his encircled army of 20,000 infantry and 3,273 cavalry. The officers were released on the condition that they not serve against France until formally exchanged for French officers captured by the Austrians, an agreement to which they held.

== Prelude to battle ==
On the battlefield the intervening mountain range obstructs the view between the two forces at opposite ends of the crescent-shaped curve of the river.

The few Austrian corps not trapped at Ulm withdrew toward Vienna, with the French in close pursuit. A Russian army under Gen. Mikhail Kutuzov also maneuvered away from the French, withdrawing to the east. At the Ill river on 22 October it joined with the retreating Austrian corps commanded by Michael von Kienmayer. On 5 November the Coalition forces held a successful rearguard action in Amstetten. On 7 November the Russians arrived in St. Pölten and crossed the Danube river the next day. Late on 9 November they destroyed the bridges across the Danube, holding the last one at the hamlet of Stein, near the village of Krems, until the late afternoon.

=== Battlefield ===
To the east of Stein, 2 kilometers (1.2 mi) down an old road, lay Krems, with its small population of a few hundred, at the confluence of the stream of that name and the Danube. To the west of Stein the Danube made a large curve, creating a crescent-shaped floodplain between it and the mountains. At the far western end of the floodplain, where the mountains came down almost to the river's edge, was Dürenstein with its castle, known as Schloss Dürenstein. The castle had served as a prison for Richard I of England in 1193. In 1645–46, during the Thirty Years' War, the Swedes had fortified the castle and then demolished it when they withdrew. It stands at 159 meters (522 ft), on the highest ridge of a mountain fissured with clefts and pinnacles of granite. Because the mountain was sparsely vegetated, it was difficult to distinguish the ruins from the rocks. Narrow canyons cut through the mountain, and widen into the plain below. Between Dürenstein and Stein, on the flood plain, lay the hamlets of Oberloiben and Unterloiben. Near the hamlets, the Loiben flood plain was at its widest, extending at the most 762 meters (2,500 ft) from the base of the Loibenberg mountain to the bank of the river.

The region was known for its wine. Since the 15th century the local inhabitants practiced viticulture and the wine producers formed St. Paul Vintners' Guild in 1447, the oldest such guild in the German-speaking world. Terraced vineyards extended up the sides of the Krems River until it became a mountain stream and terrain was unsuitable for cultivation. The Loiben plain supported both viticulture and agriculture. As the terrain became steeper, the vines grew in terraces built from the dark Urgestein, primordial rock. From Dürenstein to Krems the river makes its wide curve; the mountains and the steeply terraced slopes prevent clear line-of-sight between the two towns.

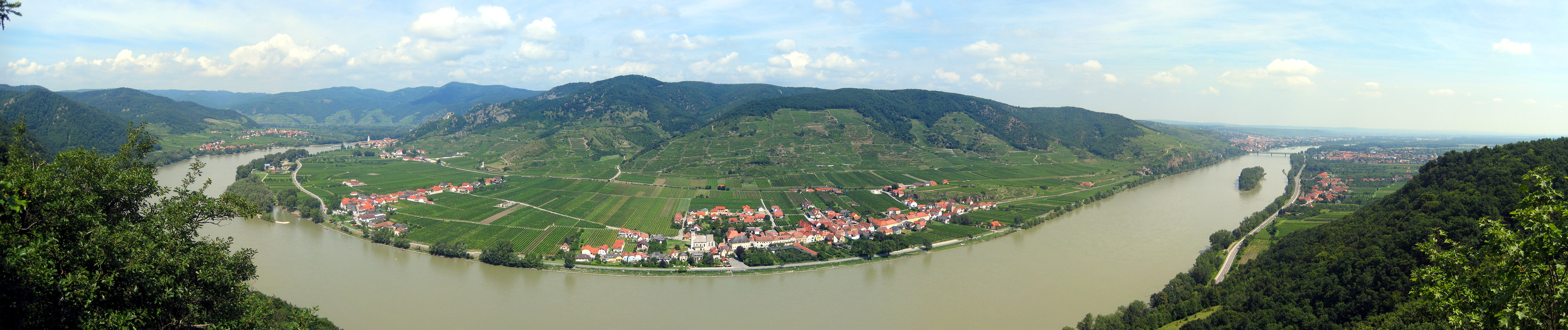
Dürenstein, far left, lies on the end of the mountain promontory that extends to the river bank. The Danube river (flowing left to right) curves around the promontory, passes the Loiben plain (with Oberloiben and Rossatz to the left and Unterloiben to the right) to Stein and Krems, on the far right. The bridge across the river at Krems had been destroyed. The curve of the river around the promontory meant the French, in Dürenstein, did not have a direct line of sight from one end of the battlefield to the other. The battle occurred on this plain, between Dürenstein and Krems.

=== Dispositions ===
Napoleon had calculated that Kutuzov, expecting reinforcements from Russia to defend its political allies, would withdraw toward Vienna; he envisioned that his and Kutuzov's armies would engage in a great battle at Vienna, and that this battle would decide the war. Consequently, Napoleon drew divisions from four of the other seven corps of the Grande Armée to create a new VIII Corps. This corps was to secure the north shore of the Danube, block any of the Austrian or Russian groups from reinforcing one another and, more importantly, prevent Kutuzov from crossing the river and escaping to Russia.

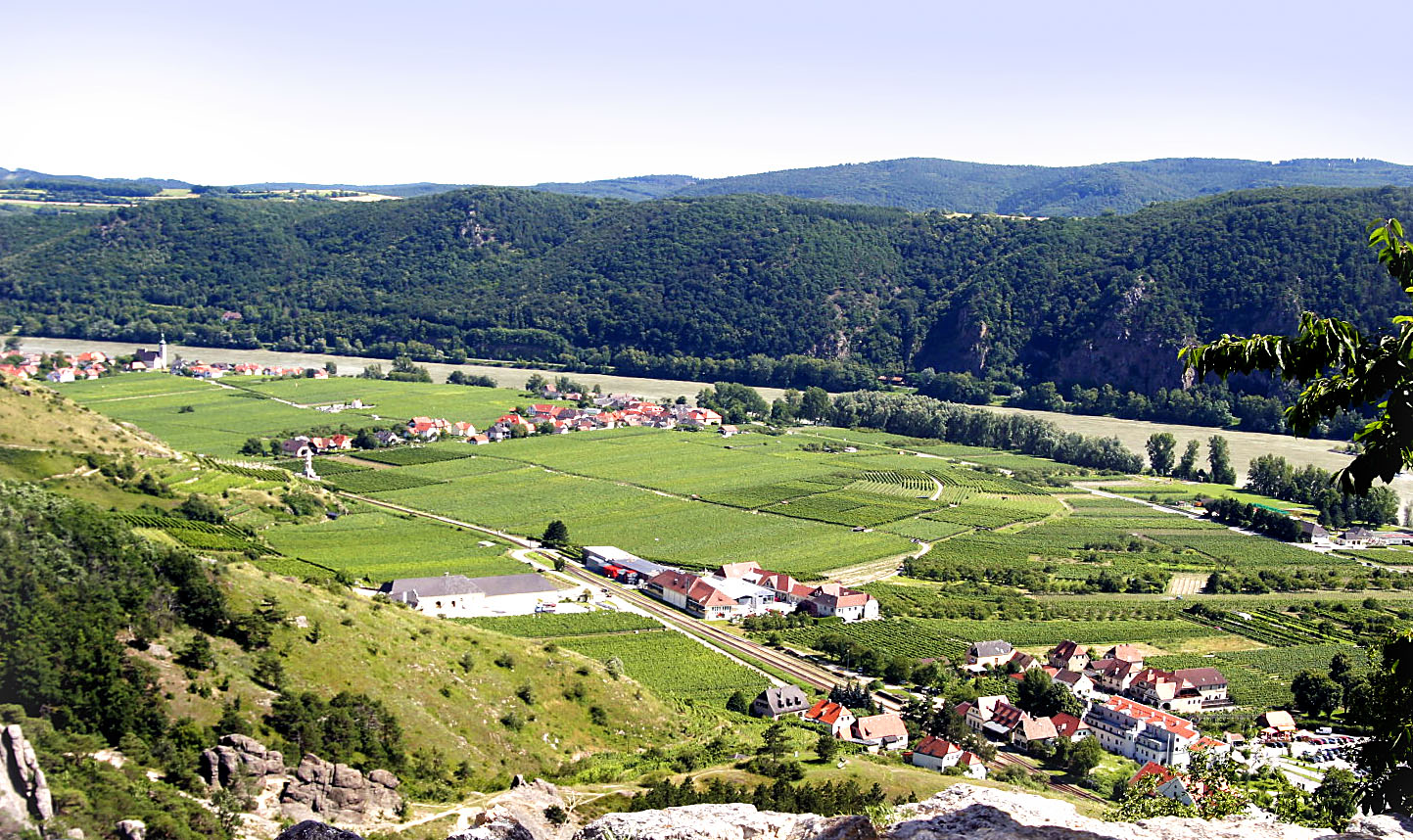
The French occupied the vineyards in the floodplain and were surrounded by Russian troops emerging from the defiles of the mountains. Another column of Russians approached Dürenstein from the south.

The new VIII Corps, under the overall command of Édouard Mortier, included three infantry divisions and a division of cavalry (see Order of Battle below). Corps Mortier, as it was known, crossed the Danube at Linz and Passau in early November 1805 and marched east, on the north bank of the Danube. Operating independently, the corp's cavalry conducted reconnaissance ahead of them and on the flanks. Gen. Gazan's division (about 6,000 men) took the lead; Mortier was with them. They were followed by Dupont's division (another 4,000) about one day's march behind. Jean-Baptiste Dumonceau's division (another 4,000), marching another day behind Dupont, brought up the rear. A flotilla of 50 boats acquired at Passau provided communications across the Danube. Before sending Mortier on his mission, Napoleon instructed him to protect his north flank at all times against possible Russian reinforcements, advice he reiterated in subsequent written orders. Napoleon also advised Mortier to secure all crossings of the Danube between Linz and Vienna.

On 9 November Gazan's division reached Marbach an der Donau and covered the 50 kilometers (31 mi) to Dürenstein by early on the following afternoon. Here it skirmished with some Russian patrols to the east of the town and expelled them. Feeling confident, the French established a forward post just upstream from Stein. In Dürenstein itself, Mortier established his command post and directed the construction of a small field hospital. Although the position seemed secure, Mortier ignored Napoleon's strict instructions and neglected to protect his left (north) flank.

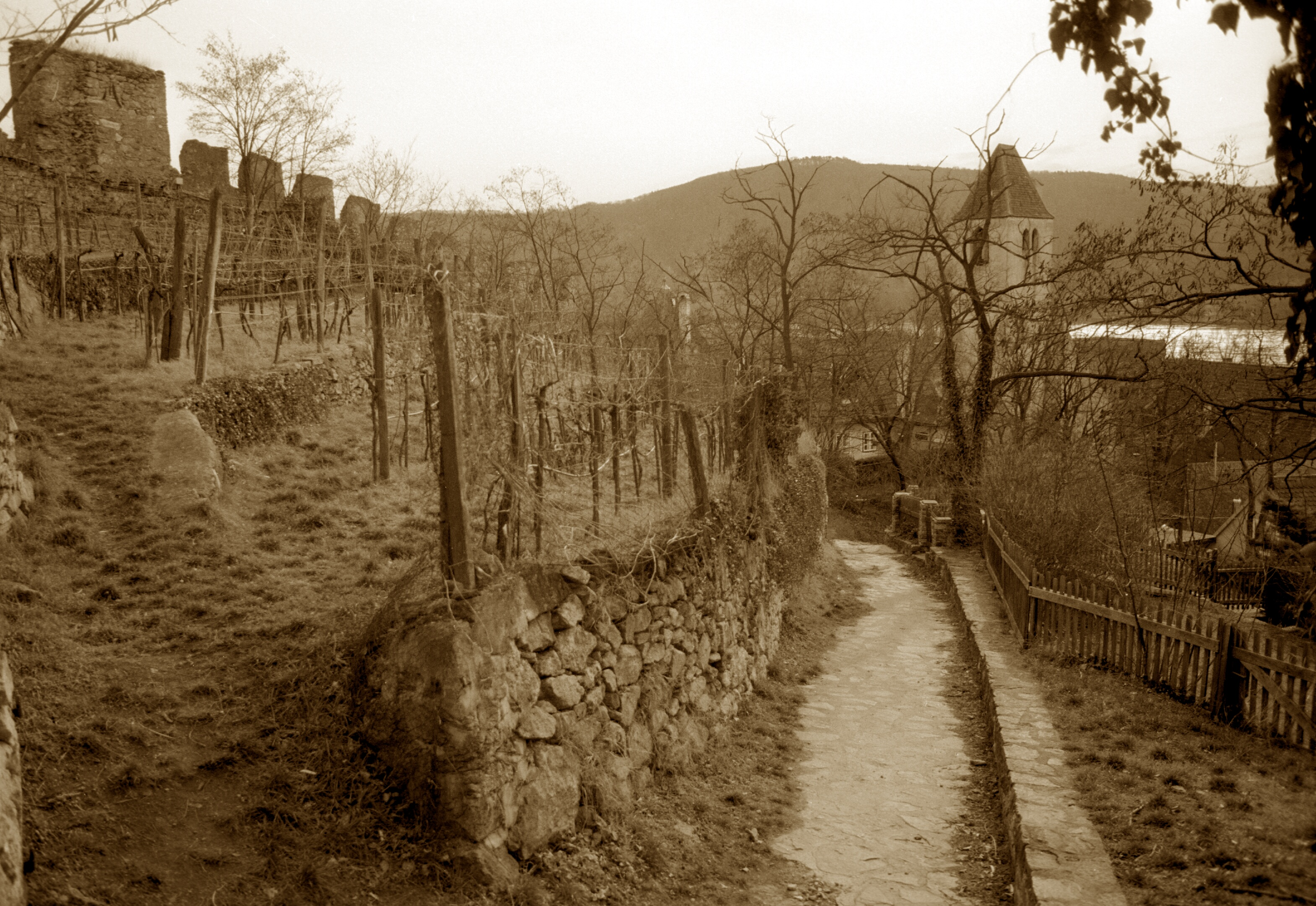
The narrow paths and steep hillsides made the deployment of artillery difficult.

This failure was an important factor when Mortier lost his corps' so-called "eyes": after he and Gazan had crossed the Danube, the French dragoons had veered to the northwest, leaving only three squadrons of the 4th Dragoons available for reconnaissance. These had left the division and were operating independently of Gazan's command. Consequently, Mortier and Gazan marched blindly through the narrow canyon west of Dürenstein, not knowing what lay ahead of them. Kutuzov had led the Coalition army across the Danube at Krems, a short distance past Stein, and destroyed the bridge behind him. His actions deprived the France commanders of a possible route across the Danube, putting the deployment of the entire French division at further risk in the case of retreat. In this decision Kutuzov abandoned Vienna to the French, who were converging on the Austrian capital from the north, west and southwest, for the security of uniting with reinforcements from Galicia. Contrary to Napoleon's expectation, Kutuzov chose a military solution over a political one.

Unknown to either Gazan or Mortier, the Coalition had concentrated a force of approximately 24,000 men (mostly Russians and a few Austrians) within a few kilometers of the French position at Dürenstein. In comparison, Gazan's division had only 6,000 men. The Austro-Russian force was a mixture of infantry, Jägers (frequently deployed as skirmishers), Russian musketeers and Russian and Austrian cavalry, accompanied by more than 68 artillery pieces. The Russian cavalry, units of the greatly feared Cossacks, were well-suited for patrolling the river bank; indeed, on 9 November they had taken 40 French soldiers as prisoners. Furthermore, reinforcements stood in Moravia, less than two weeks' march away. If the main body of the French army crossed the river, they would require time to prepare. Kutuzov, who had learned the military arts under the tutelage of the legendary Russian Generalissimo Suvorov, had overall command and would have ample warning of any large-scale French movement.

After the afternoon's initial skirmishing with the French, Kutuzov held a council of war on the evening of 10 November at Melk, at the great abbey there. He knew several things. First, he knew the positions of the French from prisoners his Cossacks had captured. He also knew that Gazan had crossed at Linz and was well ahead of any French reinforcements: Dupont had crossed at Passau and, by 10 November, stood at Marbach, 50 kilometers (31 mi) upstream, and Dumonceau was another 7 kilometers (4 mi) further behind Dupont. Kutuzov knew the size of the French force—its division strength—and its positions, and he knew that most of the dragoons were not covering the French flank but had turned north. He also knew, or had made a good supposition, about Napoleon's orders, so he knew what to offer Mortier and Gazan as bait.

=== Battle plan ===
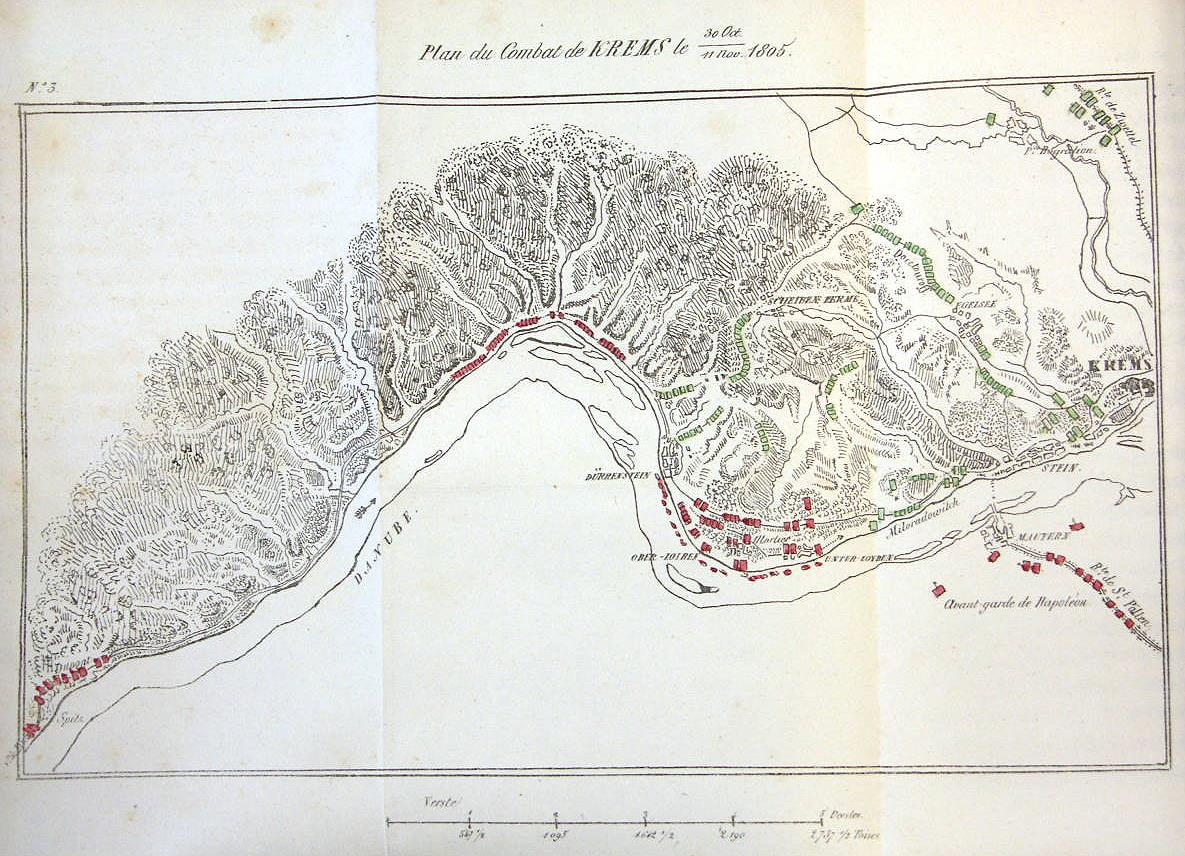
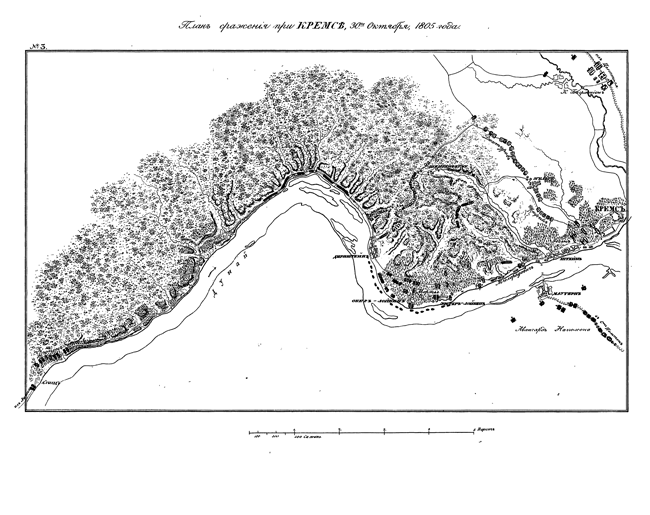
An early analysis of the battle plan on Russian (1844) and French (1846) languages shows the Russian troop movements in green and the French troop movements in red by Alexander Mikhailovsky-Danilevsky.

In addition to the Russian generals, the council included Austrian commanders Lieutenant Field Marshal Johann Heinrich von Schmitt and Friedrich Karl Wilhelm, Fürst zu Hohenlohe. Although retired since 1800, Schmitt had been recalled after the Ulm debacle and had come to Kutuzov highly recommended by the Emperor. He was an experienced tactician and strategist and had served in a variety of posts in the Habsburg military; he had been Archduke Charles' trusted adviser during the campaigns from 1796 to 1800 and had assisted in planning several of Charles' victories. Upon his recall, Schmitt was appointed Chief of the Quartermaster General Staff of the Coalition Army. The generals also had found among the Austrian force one Capt. Christoph Freiherr von Stiebar (1753–1824), who had knowledge of the local geography.

Together, Schmitt, Kutuzov and the other generals, with von Stiebar's advice on the local terrain, concocted a plan to encircle the French at Dürenstein. Russian commander Mikhail Miloradovich would approach Gazan's division from the east, supported by Pyotr Bagration's corps, and pin the French in place. Three additional columns, commanded by Dmitry Dokhturov (Doctorov), Maj. Gen. Strik and Schmitt, would outflank the French from the west and the north. They would offer, as bait, a rumor: the Russian army was retreating into Moravia and only a rearguard would be left at Krems.

== Battle ==
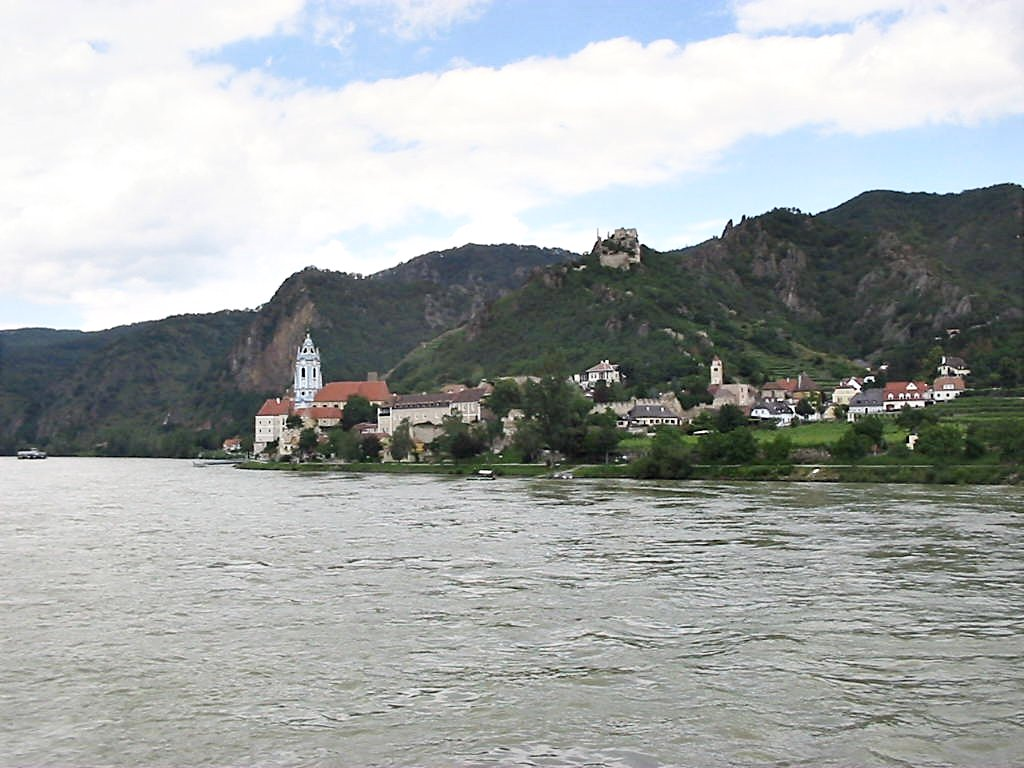
Dürenstein sits at the narrow end of the flood plain.

On the night of 10–11 November a Russian column under Strik's command began its passage through the narrow canyons, intent on arriving at Dürenstein by noon; two more columns, under Dokhtorov and Schmitt, moved in wider semicircles, planning to pass through the mountains and attack the French, who were extended along the river bank. According to the plan, in late morning Strik's column would emerge from the mountains first and launch a flanking assault on the French right. This flanking attack, combined with Miloradovich's frontal assault from Stein, would force the French into a vise; encircled, they would have no option but to surrender—or die. To ensure the success of the plan, the second and third columns, under Dokhtorov and Schmitt, would arrive in early and mid-afternoon and support the earlier assaults. In this way, even if the French tried to retreat west to Marbach, they would not escape the vise-like grip of the Coalition army.

=== Miloradovich vs. Gazan ===
Mortier accepted the bait of a rumored Russian retreat. In the early morning of 11 November he and Gazan departed from Dürenstein to seize Stein and Krems, presuming the Russians had either abandoned the settlements or left only a small rear-guard behind. As they approached Stein, a column of Miloradovich's troops attacked the French forward positions. Thinking this force was the rumored Russian rear guard, Mortier ordered Gen. Gazan to counterattack and push east towards the town of Stein. Fighting spread through the villages of Oberloiben, Unterloiben and the farm at Rothenhof. Instead of withdrawing, as a rear guard would, more and more Russian troops appeared and engaged the French column.

Initially Gazan made rapid progress, but he quickly recognized that the opposing force was much stronger than the typical rearguard of a retreating army. Realizing he had been duped and that Gazan's troops were tiring rapidly, Mortier sent orders to Dupont's division to hurry forward. By mid-morning the French momentum had stalled; Mortier committed most of his remaining forces to driving Miloradovich back, leaving a single battalion—perhaps 300 troops—to cover his northern flank, and sent the rest to attack the Russian right. Within 30 minutes he achieved the superiority of numbers he sought. His 4,500 French opposed 2,600 Russians and forced them back toward Stein while pressing an attack along the river. Miloradovich had no option, for neither Strik's nor Dokhtorov's flanking columns were to be seen.

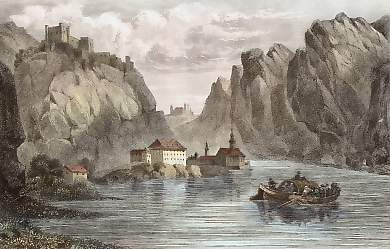
At Dürenstein, the river cuts through the fissured rock, creating a narrow canyon. The French had little room to maneuver as the Russians attacked them from the canyons that ran perpendicular to the river.

=== Dokhturov's and Dupont's reinforcements ===
Fighting paused. Mortier and Gazan waited for Dupont's arrival while Kutuzov and Miloradovich waited for Strik's and Dokhturov's. Schmitt's column was expected to be the last to join the fight because it had to march the greatest distance. The timing of the respite—12:00 or 14:00—varies, depending on whose reports are consulted. Strik arrived first and immediately assaulted Gazan's line with three battalions, pushing the French out of Dürenstein. Caught between two strong forces, Gazan attempted to push his way back through Dürenstein, to reach the river where the flotilla could evacuate his exhausted troops. Withdrawing through the narrow Danube canyon and fighting off the Russian force at their rear, Gazan and his division were trapped when more of Strik's Russians appeared to block their retreat. The narrow defiles hampered the Russians; Strik's men had to march out of the canyons, form ranks and attack in waves. Despite Strik's continuous assault in the next two to three hours, Mortier and Gazan pushed the Russians back up the narrow fissure in the hillside. At this point, Dokhturov's column appeared behind the French line and joined the battle. The French were outnumbered more than three to one, assaulted in the front by Miloradovich's column, in the middle by Strik's and in the rear by Dokhturov.

Earlier in the morning Dupont had proceeded with his column south and east along the river, from Marbach, according to instructions. Even before the arrival of Mortier's courier, he heard the sound of artillery in the distance and sent riders ahead to discover the cause. They came back to report that a Russian column (Dokhturov's) was descending from the mountains to take the road to Dürenstein. Realizing this would separate him from the forward division, Dupont hustled his troops toward the sound of battle and deployed them to take the Russians in the flank. The French assault, heralded by cannon fire, caused Dokhturov's troops to turn their attention from Gazan's beleaguered force to face these new assailants. Although superior in numbers, Dokhturov's column had no supporting artillery, and the narrow space prevented them from taking advantage of their size. It was Dokhturov's turn to face attackers at his front and rear, until the arrival of Schmitt's column, which wended its way through the mountains in the west.

=== Schmitt's arrival ===
Dokhturov was forced to fall back to the main army. Schmitt arrived at dusk, and the action continued well after dark; in mid-November night falls at close to 17:00 in the upper Danube climes. Despite the darkness, Schmitt descended out of the defiles and deployed his troops to assail Dupont's flank. As his Russians entered the fray, they came between a battalion of French and another of Russians. With the additional force, the French were overwhelmed, but most of the shooting subsided when the combatants could not tell apart friend from foe in the dark. Under the cover of darkness, aided by a waning moon, Mortier used the French flotilla to evacuate his exhausted troops to the south bank. The French and Russians continued to skirmish fitfully into the night as sentries encountered one another in the dark. Portions of Gazan's force provided any necessary rear guard action, and the following morning the remaining men were evacuated from the north shore of the Danube, while they maintained possession of only Spitz and Weissenkirchen on the north bank. Russian troops continued their retreat beyond the Krems River.

=== Losses ===
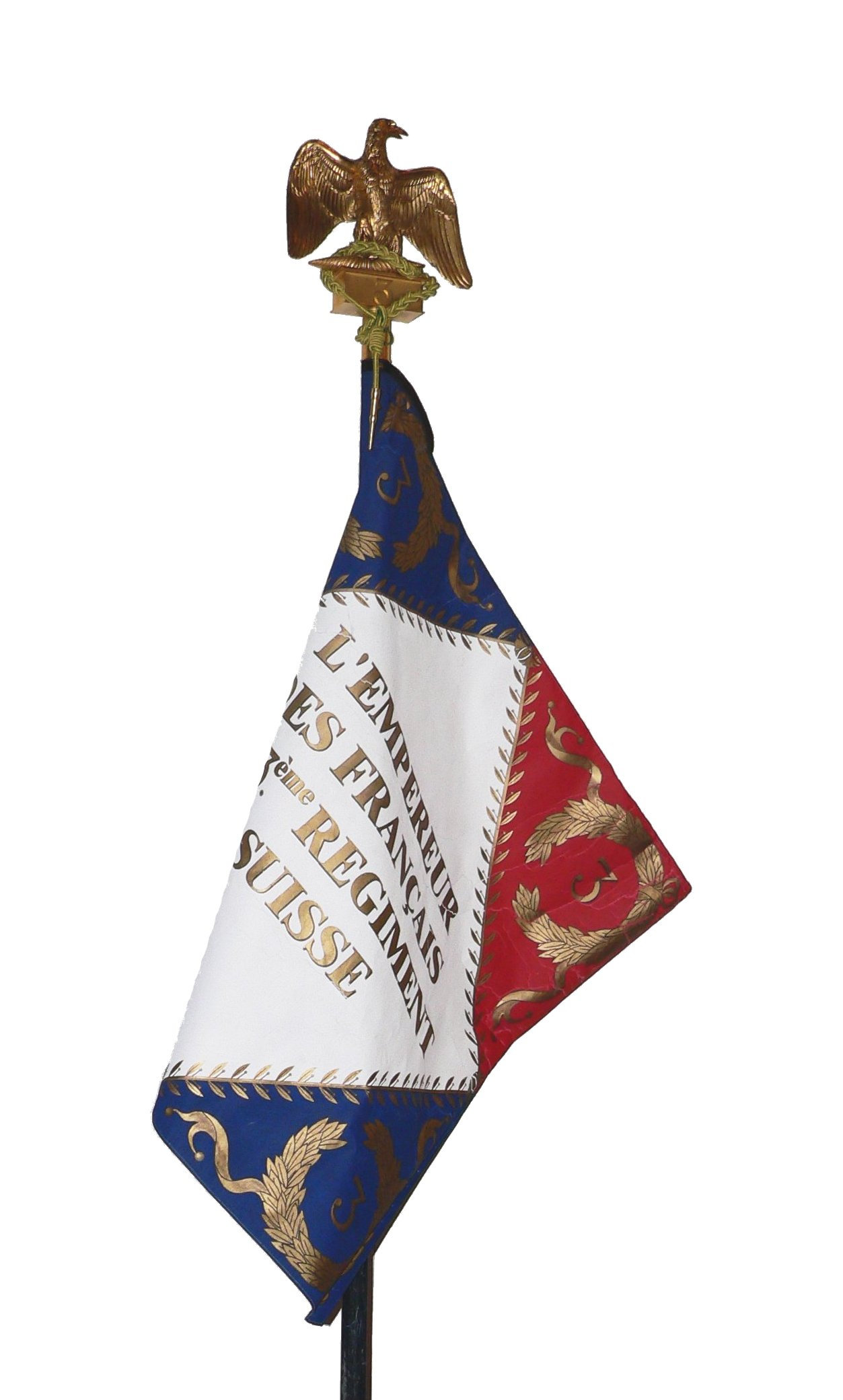
The capture of a unit's guidon, or standard, and the Imperial eagle, was an honour to the unit that captured it and a disgrace to the unit that lost it.

Losses were heavy on both sides; however, the French were temporarily shocked by this battle and were forced to suspend operations on the Danube. 1,500 French prisoners, the eagle of the 4th regiment, 5 guns, a standard and a banner as trophies for the Russians. The total losses of the French, according to Oleg Sokolov (2019), amounted to 2,500 – 3,000 people. Gaston Bodart (1908) raises French losses to 6,600. The commander of the 1st brigade Grendorj was captured by the Russians. Russian military historian Alexander Mikhailovsky-Danilevsky (1844) estimates the coalition's losses at 2,000, which would be less than the French losses. In the future, imperial publications (1854, 1888) devoted to the battle stated that the coalition's losses were unknown. Bodart claim 4,000 casualties for coalition, also less than French losses. Sokolov, on the other hand, claims that the Russian-Austrian troops suffered greater losses than the French, whose casualties he put at c. 3,500. The Austrian Lieutenant Field Marshal Schmitt was killed as the battle concluded, probably by Russian musketry in the confused melee. The vineyards and the villages of Ober- and Unterloiben were destroyed, as was most of Dürenstein and Stein. Krems was heavily damaged; the French plundered the town at least twice, and "barbarously handled" its inhabitants.

== Aftermath ==
Both sides withdrew and claimed victory. Sokolov expressed the result this way: "On the one hand, it was an undoubted success for the Russian army. Having managed to break away from pursuit, Kutuzov launched a powerful counterattack. Despite the overwhelming superiority of the French army in the theater of military operations, it turned out that the Russian commander brought forces to the battlefield that in turn had overwhelming superiority over the enemy. This, in fact, is what strategic talent consists of. The famous French commander Marshal Bugeaud once said: 'Rarely does one retreat as a lion.' Kutuzov managed to do this. On the other hand, from a tactical point of view, the Russian command organized the battle extremely unsuccessfully. As a result, almost always on the battlefield the Russians, if not in the minority, then had at least a minimal numerical advantage." Although losses were fairly equal in terms of numbers—as per Digby Smith (1998), around 4,000 wounded or dead on each side—the Coalition forces went into battle with 24,000 men (up to half of them were involved) while the French started with Gazan's division of about 6,000, which grew close to 8,000 when Dupont's men joined the fighting in the afternoon. Regardless, Gazan's division was nearly destroyed; the 30 percent losses experienced by the French fell predominantly on his division. (Note: ^{Russian victory claim:}) Clearly for both sides, the fighting was hard. The weather had been cold; an early storm had left slick icy mud in the roadways, and icicles "like chandeliers" hung from the trees.

For the Coalition, the Russians were secure on the north bank of the Danube, awaiting reinforcements from Galicia; the bridges between Linz and Vienna had been destroyed, making French access to the Austrian capital more difficult, but not impossible. After six months of fighting in which the Austrians had enjoyed little good news, the Coalition could claim a difficult and timely victory. The French had retreated from the field with a badly mauled division and Kutuzov had secured the right flank. Indeed, Francis was so pleased with the outcome at Dürenstein that he awarded Kutuzov the Military Order of Maria Theresa.

For the French, the survival of the Corps Mortier seemed nothing short of a miracle. The remainder of Gazan's division crossed the river the next morning and eventually recuperated in Vienna, which the French acquired by deception later in the month. More importantly for them, the French force had performed well over difficult terrain and under terrible combat conditions. Initially there had been some panic and parts of at least one French battalion had tried to escape on the flotilla craft. They had lost control of the boats in the current and smashed into the pillars of the burned bridge at Krems, overturning their boats. Tossed into the icy river, most had drowned. Despite this initial panic, Gazan's column retained its cohesion, and responded well to various difficult demands. Dupont had demonstrated his tactical acumen: when he heard cannon fire, he directed his troops toward it to support the French division. In terms of French staffing, Mortier's failure to guard his flank, especially in the face of Napoleon's direct advice, adversely influenced his relationship with his commander. However, in the immediate weeks ahead, the flamboyant Murat did more to annoy Napoleon than Mortier had. In assessing the battle and its aftermath, historians have laid the blame and credit for its outcome not only on Mortier and Gazan: "Napoleon, aware of Mortier's danger and his own culpability for it, vented his frustration on Murat, whom he unjustly accused of abandoning Mortier for the empty glory of riding through Vienna."

After the victory at Austerlitz, Napoleon dispersed the VIII Corps and reassigned Mortier. However disappointed he may have been with Mortier, Napoleon was pleased with Gazan's performance. As recognition of his conduct in what the French called "the immortal Battle of Dürenstein", Gazan received the Officer's Grand Cross of the Legion of Honour.

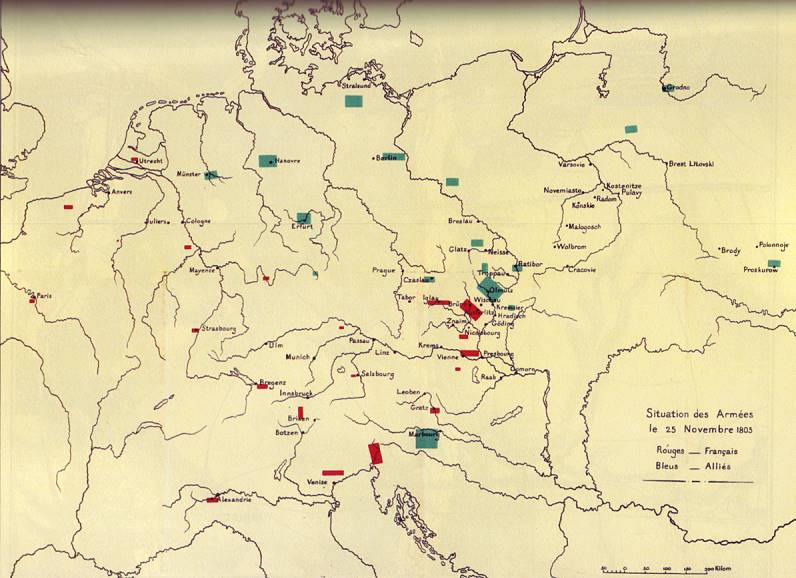
By 25 November the Coalition and French troops had concentrated in the vicinity of Austerlitz, about 146 kilometers (91 mi) east of Krems an der Donau.

The loss of Schmitt was a significant blow to the Austrian military organization. Called out of retirement for this specific task, he was the most experienced Habsburg general staff officer, second only to the Archduke Charles. From mid-1796 until his retirement in 1800 he had been Chief of the Quartermaster General Staff of the Army, the Lower Rhine, the Rhine and the Army of Germany. Furthermore, he was a trusted member of Archduke Charles' staff. He had helped to design several of Charles' more important victories at Emmendingen, Schliengen, the sieges at Kehl and Hünigen, the battles at Ostrach and Stockach, and the northern Swiss Campaign of 1799 that included battles at Winterthur and Zürich. An experienced officer and excellent tactician, he might well have made a more effective Chief of the Quartermaster General Staff of the Coalition Army at the Battle of Austerlitz than his eventual replacement, Franz von Weyrother. In Schmitt's absence, Weyrother, the architect of the Austrian catastrophe at Hohenlinden in 1800, was chosen to develop the general battle plan of Coalition action at Austerlitz. Schmitt, undoubtedly a far better tactician than Weyrother, and possessor of superior training and mapping skills, would have developed a more realistic Coalition plan for Austerlitz. Schmitt's presence would probably not have been enough to turn that defeat into a victory, but it would have mitigated the magnitude of the Coalition's losses; Austerlitz was considered one of Napoleon's finest triumphs.

In the broader picture, despite the important major naval engagements, the outcome of the War of the Third Coalition was determined on the Continent, predominantly in the two major land operations. In the first, the Ulm campaign, the Habsburgs achieved such minor victories as Klenau's at Haslach-Jungingen and, after the capitulation at Ulm, isolated portions of the Austrian military evaded capture and joined with their Russian allies; Michael von Kienmayer's corps slipped out of the French encirclement and joined Kutuzov's force. A few other small forces refused to capitulate and seemingly melted into the Bavarian mountains and the Thuringian forests, to reappear in Bohemia in time for Austerlitz. Sixteen hundred cavalry, including Archduke Ferdinand and Prince Schwarzenberg, broke out of Ulm before its capitulation. Maximilian, Count of Merveldt, led his column back through the mountains into Austria, fighting rear guard actions against pursuing French forces at Steyer (Steyr) and Mariazell and a successful skirmish between the cavalry that escaped from Ulm and the French near the town of Nördlingen. These elusive units were insufficient to balance heavy losses at key battles in which the Austrians could not hold their own against the French. Between the Ulm capitulation and the Austrian and Russian defeat at Austerlitz, the contested victory at Dürenstein and another within days at Schöngrabern were the only bright spots in an otherwise dismal Austrian autumn of campaigning. Ultimately, the Austrians lost an entire army and an officer corps, which could not resume arms against France until formally exchanged. This condition crippled the Austrian military leadership and forced the recall of such pensioners as Schmitt out of retirement.

The second determining event, the decisive French victory at the Battle of Austerlitz over the combined Russian and Austrian armies, forced the Austrian withdrawal from the Coalition. The subsequent Peace of Pressburg, signed on 26 December 1805, reinforced the earlier treaties of Campo Formio and Lunéville. Furthermore, Austria ceded land to Napoleon's German allies, and paid an indemnity of 40 million francs. Victory at Austerlitz also gave Napoleon the latitude to create a buffer zone of German states between France and the states of Prussia, Russia, and Austria. These measures did not establish a lasting peace on the continent. Prussian worries about growing French influence in Central Europe sparked the War of the Fourth Coalition in 1806, in which Austria did not participate.

== Battlefield commemorations ==
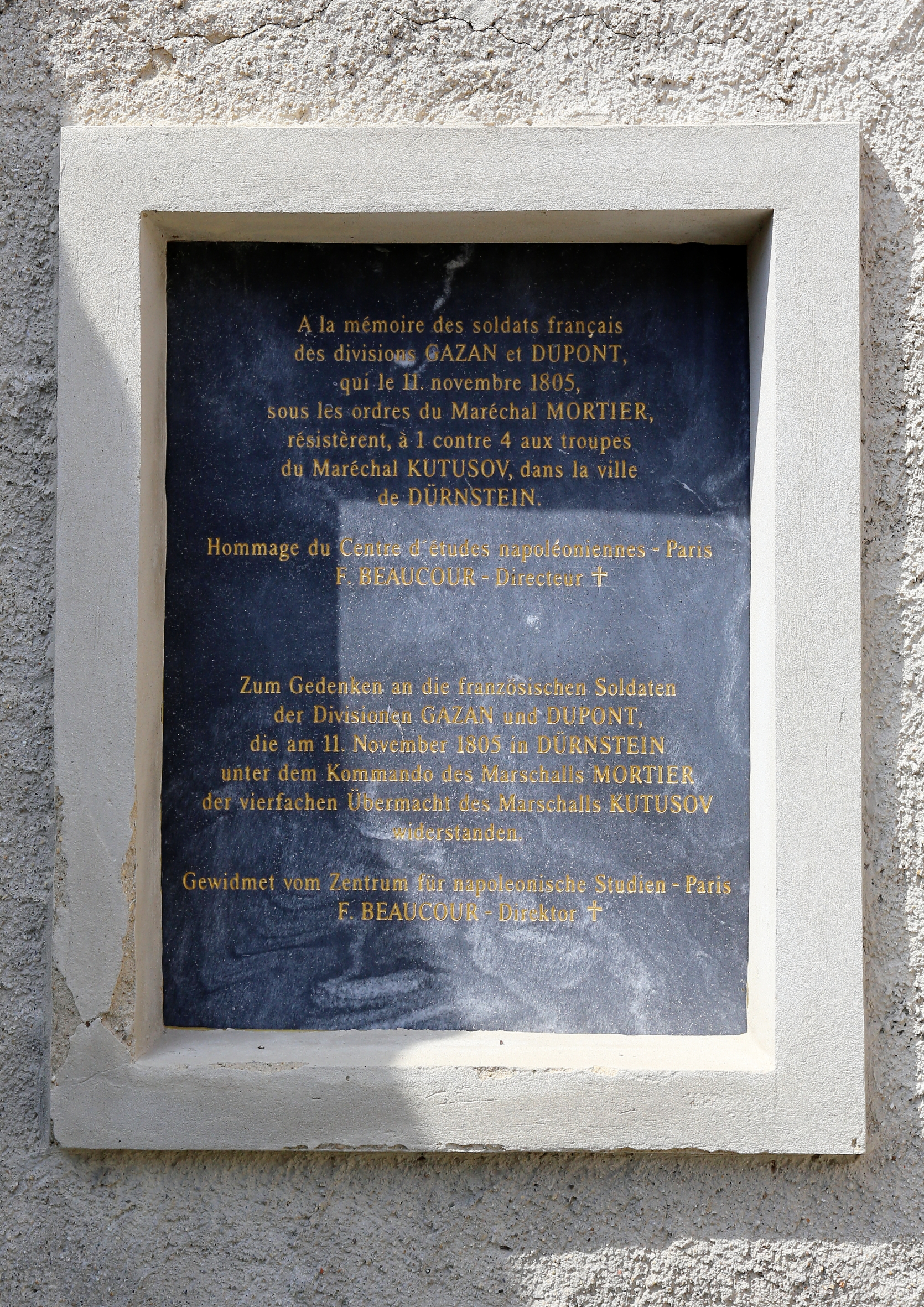
Plaque in Durnstein village commemorating the battle

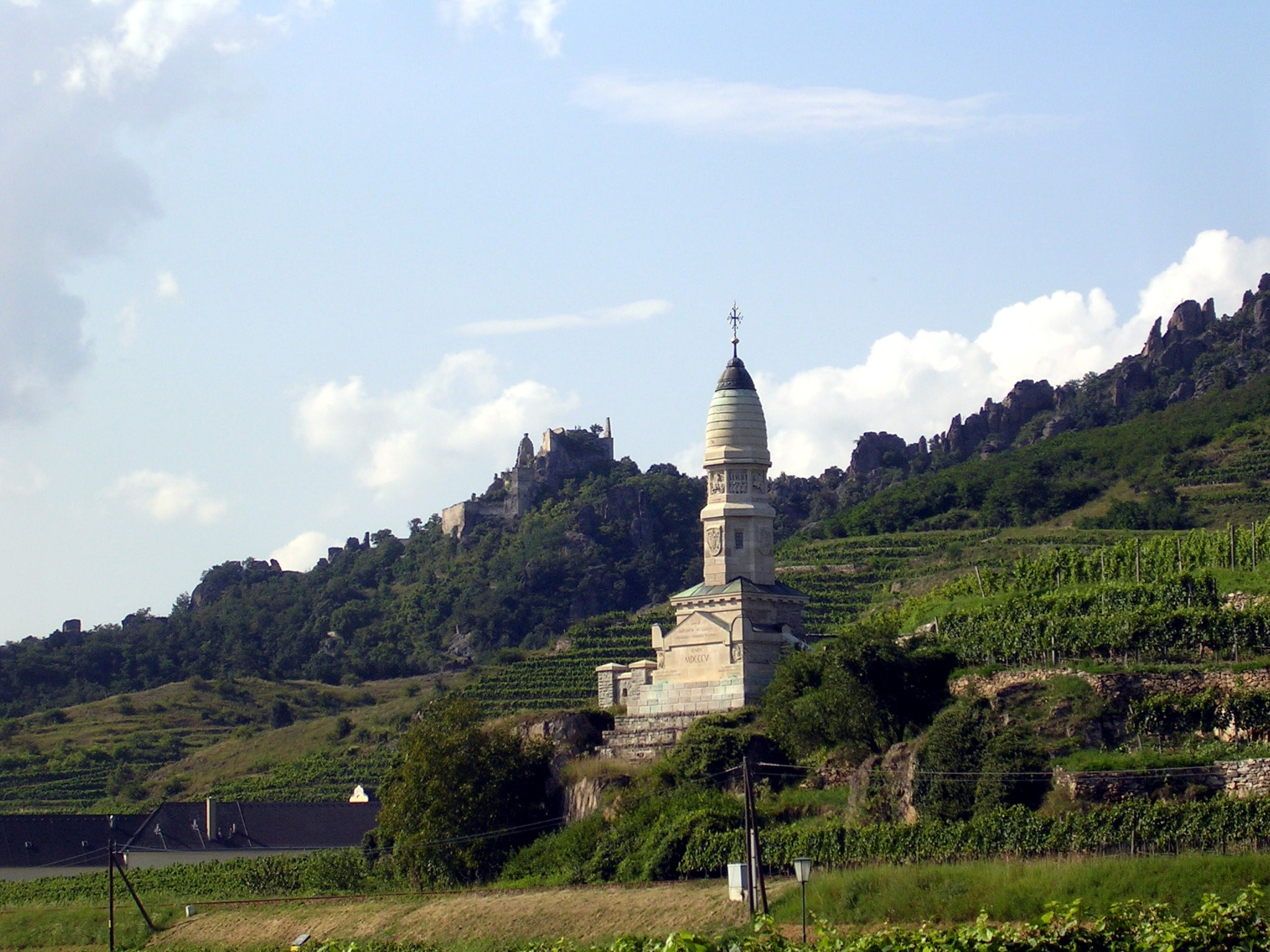
Little Frenchman Memorial at Loiben: the castle ruins are in the background.

Until 1805, Dürenstein was probably best known as the village in which crusader Richard the Lionheart was held by Leopold V, Duke of Austria. In 1741, during the War of the Austrian Succession, several hundred local villagers had held off the French and Bavarian armies, intent on capturing Vienna, by painting drain pipes to look like cannons, and beating on drums, thus suggesting the presence of a large force.

After 1805, the exploits of 40,000 French, Russian, and Austrian soldiers excited the European imagination. General Schmitt's grave has never been found, but in 1811 a monument for him was erected at the Stein Tor, the gate leading from the old village of Krems to the hamlet of Stein. The house in which Captain von Stiebar lived was marked with a bronze plate commemorating his contribution to the battle. In 1840, a Spanish lithographer created an image of the battle, which was later expanded by English lithographer John Outhwaite. The image depicts the evacuation of French troops via the Danube flotilla (see Infobox image) on a moonlit night. In fact, the moon was in its last quarter phase 48 hours later, and on 11 November probably did not provide as much light as depicted in the image.

In 1836, Jean-Antoine-Siméon Fort, a historical painter, created a watercolor of the battle, Combat de Dürnstein le 11 novembre 1805 ((in English) Battle of Dürenstein of 11 November 1805), which is in the Trianon collection at Versailles.

In the Russian novel War and Peace, Leo Tolstoy devoted several pages to the battle, its prelude, and its aftermath, and the delivery of its news to Francis II (Holy Roman Emperor) by Prince Andrew. Between Dürenstein and Rossatz, at the edge of the Loiben plain, stands the "Little Frenchman" memorial (see image) erected in 1905 to commemorate the battle; it bears the names of Mortier, Gazan, Kutuzov, Schmitt, and others on a copper-engraved plate.

== Orders of battle ==
=== French VIII. Corps (Corps Mortier) ===
On 6 November, Édouard Adolphe Mortier commanded the following forces:

- 1st Division under command of Pierre Dupont de l'Étang (formerly 1st Division of VI. Corps), six battalions, three squadrons, and three guns, most of which were involved in the fighting after mid-day.
- 2nd Division under command of Honoré Théodore Maxime Gazan de la Peyrière (formerly 2nd Division of the V. Corps), nine battalions, three squadrons, three guns.
- 3rd Division under command of Jean-Baptiste Dumonceau (Batavian Division, formerly 3rd Division of the II. Corps). The 3rd Division was not involved in the fighting.
- Dragoon Division under command of Louis Klein. Klein's division included the 1st, 2nd, 4th, and 14th Regiments of Dragoons. They were not involved in the fighting.
- Danube fleet of fifty boats, under the command of Frigate Captain Lostange.

Total: fifteen battalions, six squadrons, six guns, approximately 12,000 men, not all of which were involved in the fighting.

=== Coalition columns ===
- First Column, commanded by General of Brigade Prince Pyotr Ivanovich Bagration, included three battalions of infantry, three grenadier battalions, and three Jäger battalions, ten squadrons of Hussars.
- Second Column, Lieutenant General Essen, included six battalions of infantry, three battalions of grenadiers, and five squadrons of Hussars.
- Third Column, commanded by Lieutenant General Dokhturov, including six battalions of infantry, one battalion from the 8th Jäger regiment, and ten squadrons of the Hussar Regiment Mariupol.
- Fourth Column, commanded by Lieutenant General Schepelev, nine battalions of infantry.
- Fifth Column, Lieutenant General Freiherr von Maltitz, nine battalions of infantry.
- Sixth Column, Lieutenant General Freiherr von Rosen, with six battalions of Infantry and ten squadrons of cavalry. The Sixth Column did not take part in the fighting.
- Austrian Infantry Brigade, Major General Johann Nepomuk von Nostitz-Rieneck, four battalions of Border Infantry, including the highly decorated 9th Regiment Peterwardeiner.
- Austrian Cavalry Division, Lieutenant Field Marshal Friedrich Karl Wilhelm, Fürst zu Hohenlohe, twenty-two squadrons of cavalry.

Total: fifty-eight battalions, sixty-two squadrons, fourteen artillery batteries, approximately 24,000 men and 168 guns.

== Notes ==
Preceded by Battle of Amstetten	Napoleonic Wars; Battle of Dürenstein	Succeeded by Battle of Schöngrabern
