= Dmitry Dokhturov =

Russian general (1756–1816)

General Dmitry Dokhturov
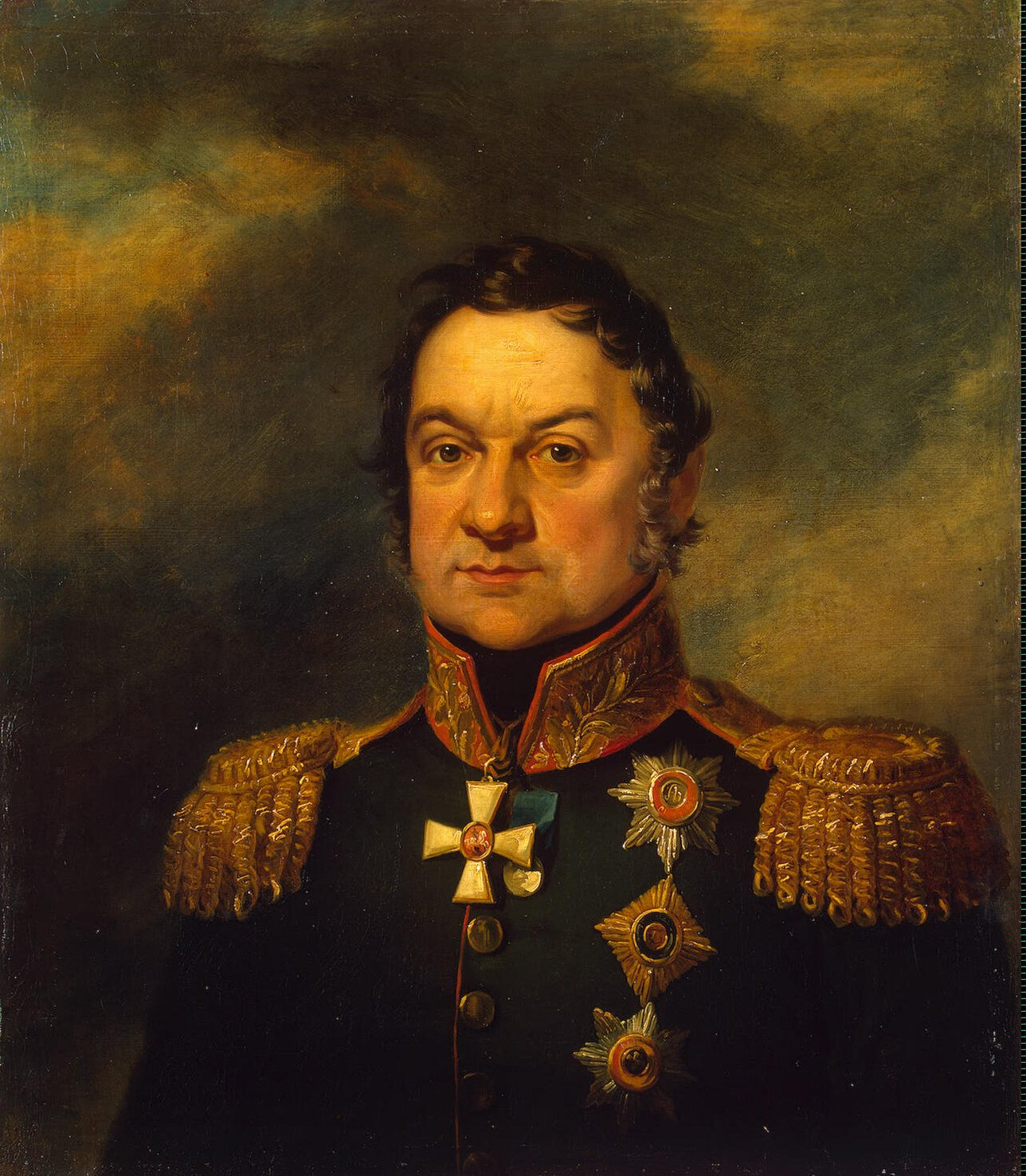
- Portrait by George Dawe, c. 1819
- Born: 12 September 1759; Moscow Governorate, Russia
- Died: 24 November 1816 (aged 57); Moscow, Russia
- Spouse: Maria Petrovna
- Children: 2
- Military career
- Allegiance: Russia
- Branch: Imperial Russian Army
- Service years: 1771–1816
- Rank: General of Infantry
- Unit: Preobrazhensky Life Guards Regiment
- Conflicts: See battles: Russo-Swedish War (1788–1790); Battle of Hogland; Battle of Svensksund (WIA); Battle of Vyborg Bay (WIA); Napoleonic Wars; War of the Third Coalition; Battle of Dürenstein; Battle of Austerlitz; War of the Fourth Coalition; Battle of Golymin; Battle of Eylau (WIA); Battle of Guttstadt-Deppen; Battle of Heilsberg (WIA); Battle of Friedland; French invasion of Russia; Battle of Smolensk; Battle of Borodino; Battle of Tarutino; Battle of Maloyaroslavets; Battle of Krasnoi; War of the Sixth Coalition; Battle of Dresden; Battle of Leipzig; Siege of Hamburg
- Awards: Order of St. George

Dmitry Sergeyevich Dokhturov (Russian: Дмитрий Серге́евич Дохтуро́в; 12 September [O.S. 1 September] 1756 – 24 November [O.S. 12 November] 1816) was a Russian infantry general and a prominent military leader during the Patriotic War of 1812.

== General ==
During the War of the Third Coalition, he participated in the Battle of Dürenstein; during this battle, in the cross-fire between Pierre Dupont and himself, Johann Heinrich von Schmitt was shot by one of Dokhturov's infantrymen. Dokhturov also commanded the first column in the Battle of Austerlitz, where his force was isolated with its back to a lake. When some of his men tried to escape over the frozen lake, French artillery fire shattered the ice and many Russians perished. In general, however, he managed to extricate his troops from the French envelopment at Pratzen.

During the War of the Fourth Coalition, Dokhturov fought at Eylau and Friedland.

Promoted to General of Infantry in 1810, Dokhturov fought in the Battle of Smolensk. In the Battle of Borodino he commanded in the center of the Russian line and after Pyotr Bagration was mortally wounded, he commanded the left flank. Dokhturov was involved in heavy fighting once again when he led his Sixth Corps in the Battle of Maloyaroslavets. When the Russians discovered that some French troops were near Fominskoe, Field Marshal Kutuzov ordered Dokhturov to attack them. But just before Dokhturov attacked, Russian partisans warned him that the French force near Fominskoe was no mere detachment; it was the main French army, commanded by Napoleon himself. Thus was a Russian catastrophe averted. Kutuzov then sent Dokhturov to Maloyaroslavets, a town with a population of 1,600 people. Here Dokhturov encountered the corps of Napoleon's stepson, Eugène de Beauharnais, which consisted of largely Italian troops. Battle raged all day in the streets of Maloyaroslavets, as 24,000 Russians fought roughly the same number of French and Italians. The Italians in particular fought with distinction in this battle. By the end of the day the town had burned to the ground, killing hundreds of wounded Russian, French, and Italian soldiers who in their desperate condition could not drag themselves out of the inferno. The battle was a draw, with perhaps a small advantage for the French and Italians. There were up to 8,000 casualties on each side. Eugène and his Franco-Italians occupied Maloyaroslavets, but Dokhturov and his Russians occupied a strong position just south of town blocking the road to Kaluga.

In the War of the Sixth Coalition, he distinguished himself in command of temporarily created corps of Leonty Bennigsen's Army of Poland. During the Battle of Leipzig, his corps took part in the assault on the city. He led the siege and capture of Magdeburg (late October – mid-November 1813) and Hamburg (January – May 1814). After that he went to Bohemia to be treated for his wounds.

In the aftermath of the Hundred Days, during the advance of Field Marshal Tolly's Russian army into France in 1815, Dokhturov commanded the right column.

== See also ==
- Dmitry Dokhturov is mentioned in Tolstoy's War and Peace, where he is lauded as a great and effective soldier who is little recognized precisely because he fulfills his role so silently and effectively.
- He is an ancestor of E. L. Doctorow.

== Sources ==
- "Дохтуров, Димитрий Сергеевич" . Brockhaus and Efron Encyclopedic Dictionary (in Russian). 1906.
