= Franz von Weyrother =

Austrian general (1755–1806)

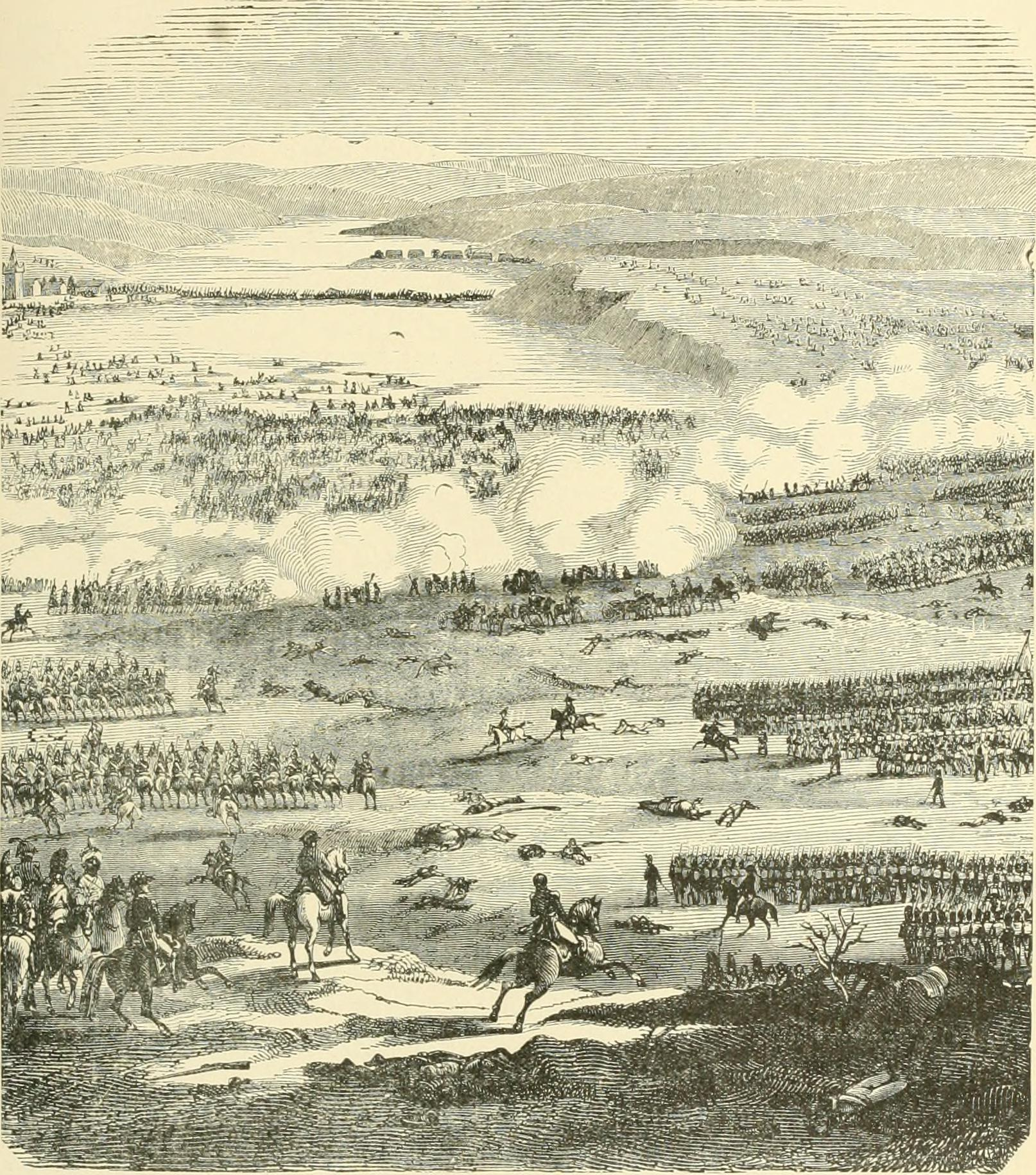
- Weyrother designed the Allied plan for the ill-fated Battle of Austerlitz
- Born: 1755; Vienna
- Died: 16 February 1806 (aged 50–51)
- Allegiance: Habsburg Monarchy
- Branch: Chief of staff
- Service years: 1761–1806
- Rank: Generalmajor
- Conflicts: French Revolutionary Wars; War of the Third Coalition

Franz von Weyrother (1755 – 16 February 1806) was an Austrian staff officer and Generalmajor who fought during the French Revolutionary Wars and the Napoleonic Wars. He drew up the plans for the disastrous defeats at the Battle of Rivoli (1797), Battle of Hohenlinden (1800) and the Battle of Austerlitz (1805), in which the Austrian Army was defeated by Napoleon Bonaparte twice and Jean Moreau once.

He was "the most striking example of the pedantry of the Hofkriegsrat school. Weyrother was cut from the same cloth as Mack and Schmitt: an out-of-touch and a pedant." Russo-French Count Louis de Langeron wrote of Weyrother that he had "all the faults of an upstart." Nevertheless, Weyrother managed to win the favor of Russian Emperor Alexander and his young favorites at Austerlitz, as Alexander shared Weyrother's idea of attacking Napoleon's weakened right flank. This is precisely why the blame for the disaster does not lie primarily with Mikhail Golenishchev-Kutuzov.

At Rivoli, nonetheless, the poor health of the Austrian commander József Alvinczi intervened as well, and at Hohenlinden, the character of the 18-year-old Austrian commander Archduke John. (Note: Battle of Hohenlinden § Background; Battle of Hohenlinden § Plans; Archduke John of Austria § Military service) Weyrother also took part in the successful for Napoleon Battle of Bassano (1796) under the command of Dagobert von Wurmser. The staff officer Weyrother, however, was involved in the rest of Alvinczi's campaign—besides Rivoli—which he helped plan and where Austrian victories over Napoleon were won at the Second Battle of Bassano and the Battle of Caldiero, and also where Napoleon won the hard-fought and costly victory at the Battle of Arcole (all three 1796). Weyrother also was the chief of staff of Paul Kray, when the Austrian victories at the Combat of Legnano and the Battle of Magnano were achieved (both 1799). In addition to the previous, he served as Alexander Suvorov's liaison officer in 1799 during his victories at the Battle of Novi and the Battle of the Gotthard Pass,—the pass that Weyrother had planned Suvorov's march through.

== Early career ==
Weyrother was born in Vienna as the son of cavalry Major (Major) Anton von Weyrother, who was Chief Rider of the Spanish Riding School in Vienna. After studying at the Ingenieurakademie in Vienna (later known as the Imperial and Royal Technical Military Academy), he joined the army as a Fahnencadet (Academy graduate) in Infanterie-regiment Nr. 22 Franz von Lacy on 1 December 1775 as Lacy was his godfather. On 1 May 1777, he was promoted to Fähnrich (cadet officer or ensign) and on 16 November 1778 to Unterlieutenant (second lieutenant). In August 1779, he was chosen by Generalmajor Major General Graf Wenzel Colloredo as his adjutant and stayed in post until 1783. On 1 June 1784, he was promoted to Oberlieutenant and after his transfer on 1 August 1787 to Infanterie-regiment Nr. 2 Erzherzog Ferdinand, he served in the 1788—1790 Turkish War as Adjutant of Feldmarschalleutnant Maximilian Browne and on 1 February 1789, was appointed to Capitain-lieutenant (junior Captain) followed by Hauptmann (full Captain) on 6 July.

The War of the First Coalition brought about Weyrother's important transfer to the Generalquartiermeisterstab on 16 July 1794 and he joined its former chief, Generalmajor Neu, who was now the Governor of the key fortress of Mainz, where he soon gained the reputation of a cunning and well-educated officer, who was entrusted by Major General Neu with defensive actions against the French besiegers, when Neu was too ill to direct them. he moved over to offensive operations and on 19 November 1794, took the Wissenau Lines, followed by the Zahlbach Lines on 1 December. GM Neu commended him to Feldmarschall Albert Casimir, Duke of Teschen for his untiring efforts and exceptional skills on 1 December 1794. Feldzeugmeister (General) Graf von Wartensleben commended Hauptmann Weyrother to Feldmarschall Clerfayt for his skillful leadership of the advance-guard in the assault on the Hartberg in May 1795, which led to his promotion to Major on 22 May, but on 30 August, in repelling a French assault on the Wissenau Lines, Weyrother was shot in the left shoulder. After his recovery, he was sent to the Army of the Rhine under the Archduke Charles to serve on his staff. On 11 May 1796, was awarded the Military Order of Maria Theresia and was promoted to Oberstleutnant (Lieutenant-Colonel).

== Italy and Bavaria ==
In September 1796, Weyrother transferred to Northern Italy, where he fought in the Battle of Bassano on 8 September 1796 under Field Marshal Dagobert von Wurmser. He then joined the renewed effort to relieve the Mantua, serving on the staff of Feldzeugmeister József Alvinczi, helping to plan the campaign, which ended in a narrow defeat by Bonaparte at the Battle of Arcole, however, distinguishing himself at the Second Battle of Bassano on 6 November 1796, which was won by Alvinczi. His own plan for the Battle of Rivoli provided for three widely separated striking forces and unrealistically called for one flanking column to march across mountainous terrain in January. His plans were compromised by Napoleon's chief spy, Toli, who obtained a copy of the plan for the advance in January 1797, which ended in a decisive Austrian defeat at the Battle of Rivoli and the consequent surrender of the fortress of Mantua.

One of a group of three, known as "Thugut's Benjamins" (trusted assistants to the Foreign Minister Johann Amadeus Francis de Paula, Baron of Thugut, during the campaign of 1799, Weyrother served as chief of staff to Feldzeugmeister Pál Kray, where he distinguished himself at Legnago (26 March), Magnano (5 April) and, now serving as liaison officer with the Russian Field Marshal Alexander Suvorov, at Novi on 15 August. He then planned the epic march of the Russian troops under Alexander Suvorov across the Saint Gotthard Pass. Promoted to Oberst (colonel) on 5 February 1800, Weyrother was given command of Infanterie-regiment Nr. 7 Schröder, which was part of the army in Germany under Pál Kray, but a further wound and the strains of campaigning led to his leaving the army to recuperate. Recalled in the autumn of 1800, Emperor Francis II assigned him to be chief-of-staff to the 18-year-old Archduke John of Austria, the new commander of the army in Bavaria, and his Adlatus (chief adviser) Franz von Lauer. Believing Jean Moreau's French army to be in retreat, Weyrother organised an aggressive pursuit through heavily forested terrain by four non-mutually-supporting columns. Instead, Moreau stood his ground, sprang an ambush, and enveloped the Austrian left flank. The resulting Battle of Hohenlinden turned out to be a catastrophe for the Austrians, effectively ending the War of the Second Coalition. Nevertheless, Weyrother was appointed military adviser to the new Foreign Minister, Graf Ludwig von Cobenzl in the negotiations following the Armistice of Steyr, which led to the Peace of Lunéville in 1801.

== Napoleonic Wars ==
Promotions

- Cadet: 1 May 1777
- Second Lieutenant: 16 November 1778
- First Lieutenant: 1 June 1784
- Junior Captain: 1 February 1789
- Captain: 6 July 1789
- Major: 22 May 1795
- Lieutenant Colonel: 1797
- Colonel: 5 February 1800
- Major General: 1 September 1805 (effective 2 April 1805)

When the War of the Third Coalition broke out, Weyrother was promoted to Generalmajor (Major General). After the death of the Allied army chief of staff, Johann Heinrich von Schmitt at the Battle of Dürenstein on 11 November 1805, the Allied commander-in-chief, the Russian General Mikhail Kutuzov requested that Weyrother be made chief of staff of the Austro-Russian army (Chief of the Quartermaster General Staff of the Allied Army). Although the two men soon fell out, as Kutuzov wanted a defensive strategy, Weyrother gained the favour of Tsar Alexander I of Russia with his aggressive strategy. With the Tsar's support, he created the plan for the Battle of Austerlitz in which the Allies were crushed by Napoleon on 2 December 1805. The defeat was so bad, the Russians accused Weyrother of being in the pay of the French. Weyrother withdrew from military life and retired to Vienna, where he died aged 51.

== In popular culture ==
His inappropriate dispositions and planning for the Battle of Austerlitz are satirised by Leo Tolstoy in his famous novel, War and Peace, and later in Russian cinema. On the big screen, Franz von Weyrother was subjected to three well-known portrayals: Yevgeny Gurov in the movie Suvorov (1941), Jack Palance in the movie Austerlitz (1960) and Erwin Knausmüller in the series War and Peace.
