= The Surrender of Bailén =

Painting by José Casado del Alisal

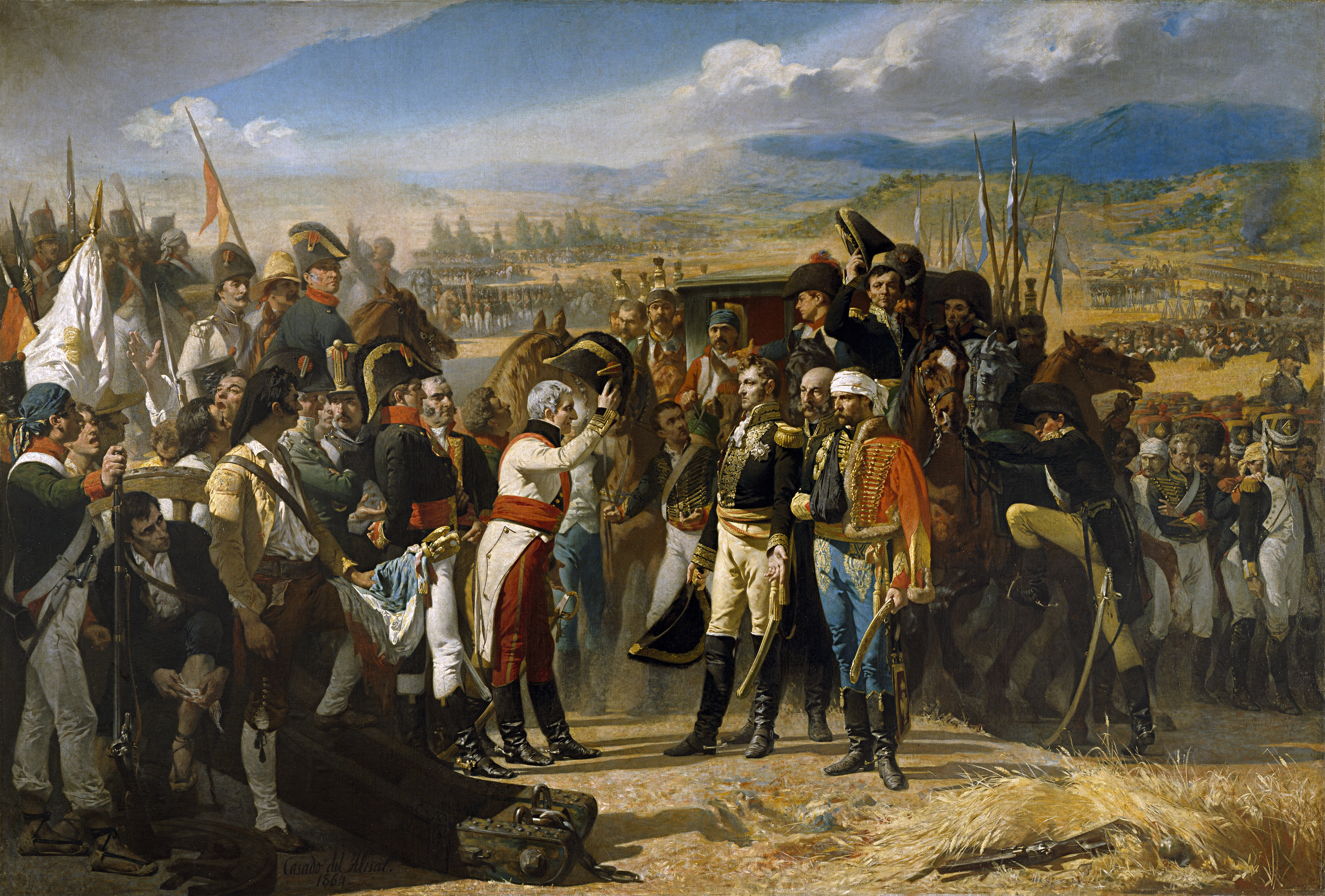
- Artist: José Casado del Alisal
- Year: 1864
- Type: Oil on canvas, history painting
- Dimensions: 338 cm × 500 cm (133 in × 200 in)
- Location: Museo del Prado; Madrid

The Surrender of Bailén (Spanish: La Rendición de Bailén) is an 1864 history painting by the Spanish artist José Casado del Alisal. It commemorates a scene from the Battle of Bailén during the early stages of the Peninsular War, the surrender of a French Army under Pierre Dupont to Spanish forces on 19 July 1808. When Napoleon attempted to place his brother Joseph on the Spanish throne, it prompted a massive uprising and drew in assistance from Britain. The victory at Bailén became a popular symbol of Spanish resistance against the French invaders.

The Spanish commander Francisco Javier Castaños is shown gallantly accepting the surrender of Dupont. The composition of the work is inspired by the Golden Age picture The Surrender of Breda by Diego Velázquez. It is historically inaccurate, as the actual surrender took place at an inn in Andújar rather than on the battlefield and the senior commanders were not present. The painting is now shown in the Museo del Prado in Madrid.

== Bibliography ==
- Díez, García. The Nineteenth Century in the Prado. T.F. Editores, 2008.
- Ginger, Andrew. Painting and the Turn to Cultural Modernity in Spain: The Time of Eugenio Lucas Velázquez. Susquehanna University Press, 2007.
