= Alexander Mikhailovsky-Danilevsky =

Russian military officer and historian (1789–1848)

- Александр Михайловский-Данилевский
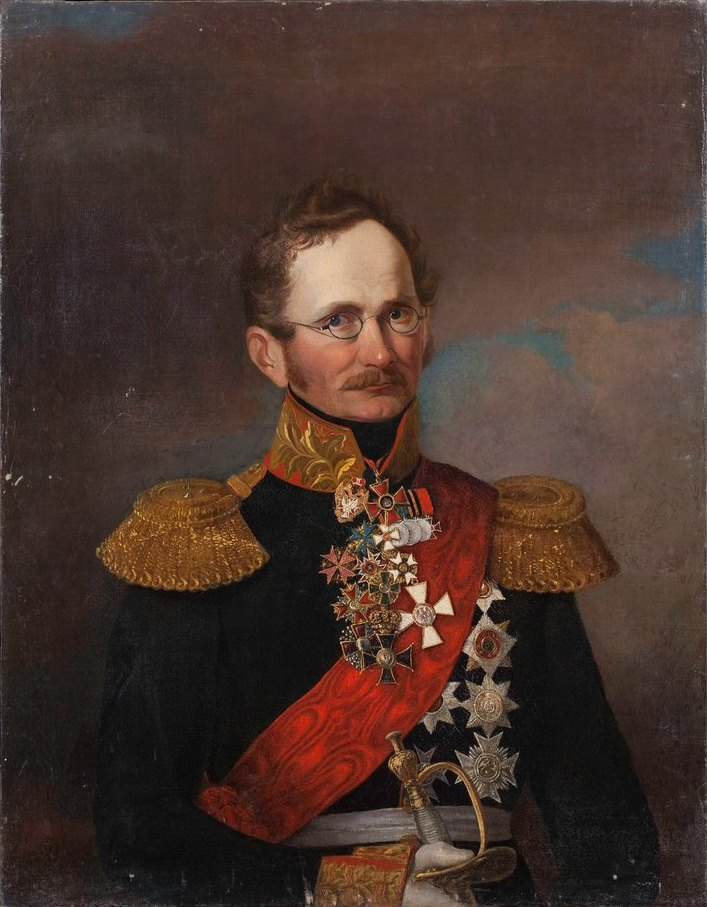
- Born: 6 September 1789
- Died: 21 September 1848 (aged 59); Saint Petersburg, Russian Empire
- Occupations: Historian, politician, lieutenant general
- Spouse: Anna Pavlovna Chemodanova
- Awards: Demidov Prize

Alexander Ivanovich Mikhailovsky-Danilevsky (Russian: Алекса́ндр Ива́нович Михайло́вский-Даниле́вский; 6 September [O.S. 26 August] 1789 – 21 September [O.S. 9 September] 1848) was a Russian Lieutenant General, senator, military writer, historian and author of the first official history of the War of 1812, written in four volumes on the instructions of Nicholas I.

== Biography ==
Alexander's father Ivan Mikhailovsky-Danilevsky was a known doctor of Ukrainian origin who studied at the University of Göttingen and briefly worked in 1789 at the Russian Ministry of Finance. Alexander studied German at Saint Peter's School joined the Saint Petersburg militia on 1 August 1812 and was chosen by Field Marshal Mikhail Kutuzov, an adjutant, mainly for correspondence in French. He fought in the Battle of Borodino and in the Battle of Tarutino where he was critically wounded.

After the war, in September 1814 Mikhailovsky-Danilevsky was a member of the Russian delegation at the Congress of Vienna and remained until its end in June 1815. In 1816, he was appointed Aide-de-camp to the Emperor, who was accompanied on his travels to the south and Russia to the congress in Aachen.

In 1829, he participated in the Russo-Turkish War of 1828–29 serving with the rank of major general under the command of Field Marshal Hans Karl von Diebitsch. He was critically wounded in the Battle of Olszynka Grochowska on 25 February 1830.

On 6 December 1835 he was promoted to lieutenant general and on 9 December he was appointed chairman of the Military Censorship Committee. In 1839 he became a senator and as such, he was appointed as a member of the council of war, where he devoted himself to army reforms until his death.

He became a member of Emperor's Council of War in 1839 and of the Imperial Academy of Sciences in 1843. He died in September 1848 in the Saint Petersburg cholera epidemic of 1847–1849. He was buried next to his wife (d. 1832) at the Tikhvin Cemetery of the Alexander Nevsky Monastery, where their tomb is preserved.
