= Marbach an der Donau =

- Municipality
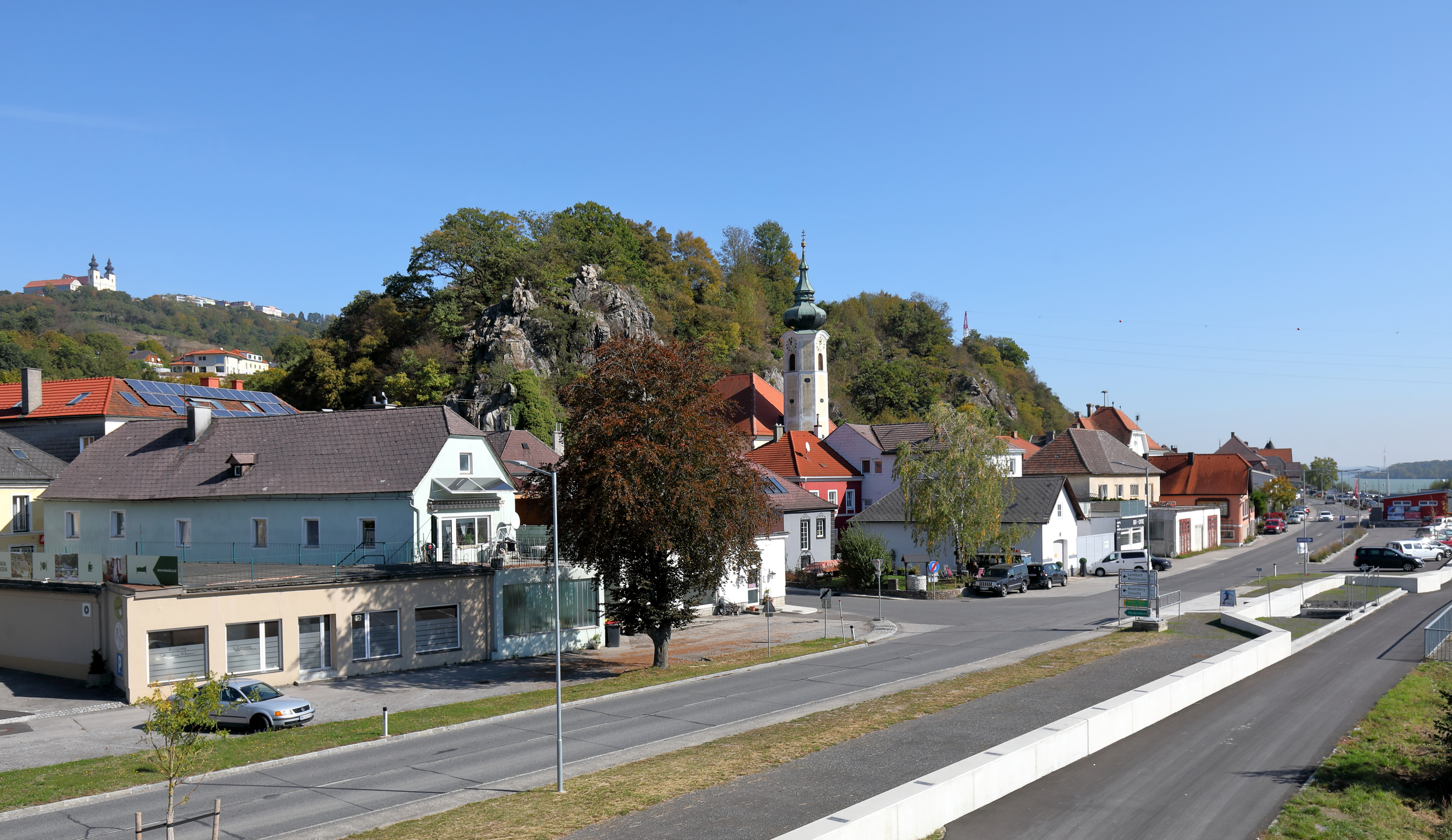
- Center of the town

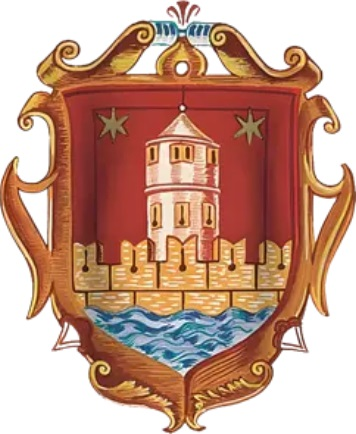
- Coat of arms

- Location within Austria
- Coordinates: 48°13′N 15°9′E
- Country: Austria
- State: Lower Austria
- District: Melk

Government
  - Mayor: Peter Grafeneder (ÖVP)

Area
  - Total: 10.66 km^{2} (4.12 sq mi)
- Elevation: 219 m (719 ft)

Population (2018-01-01)
  - Total: 1,677
  - Density: 157.3/km^{2} (407.4/sq mi)
- Time zone: UTC+1 (CET)
  - Summer (DST): UTC+2 (CEST)
- Postal code: 3671
- Area code: 07413
- Website: www.marbach-donau.at

Marbach an der Donau is a town in the district of Melk in the Austrian state of Lower Austria.

== Population ==
Historical population
| Year | Pop. | ±% |
|---|---|---|
| 1794 | 1,021 | — |
| 1830 | 1,064 | +4.2% |
| 1846 | 1,117 | +5.0% |
| 1869 | 1,308 | +17.1% |
| 1880 | 1,259 | −3.7% |
| 1890 | 1,295 | +2.9% |
| 1900 | 1,416 | +9.3% |
| 1910 | 1,495 | +5.6% |
| 1923 | 1,386 | −7.3% |
| 1934 | 1,647 | +18.8% |
| 1939 | 1,677 | +1.8% |
| 1951 | 1,660 | −1.0% |
| 1961 | 1,652 | −0.5% |
| 1971 | 1,605 | −2.8% |
| 1981 | 1,623 | +1.1% |
| 1991 | 1,620 | −0.2% |
