= Zahájí =

- Municipality
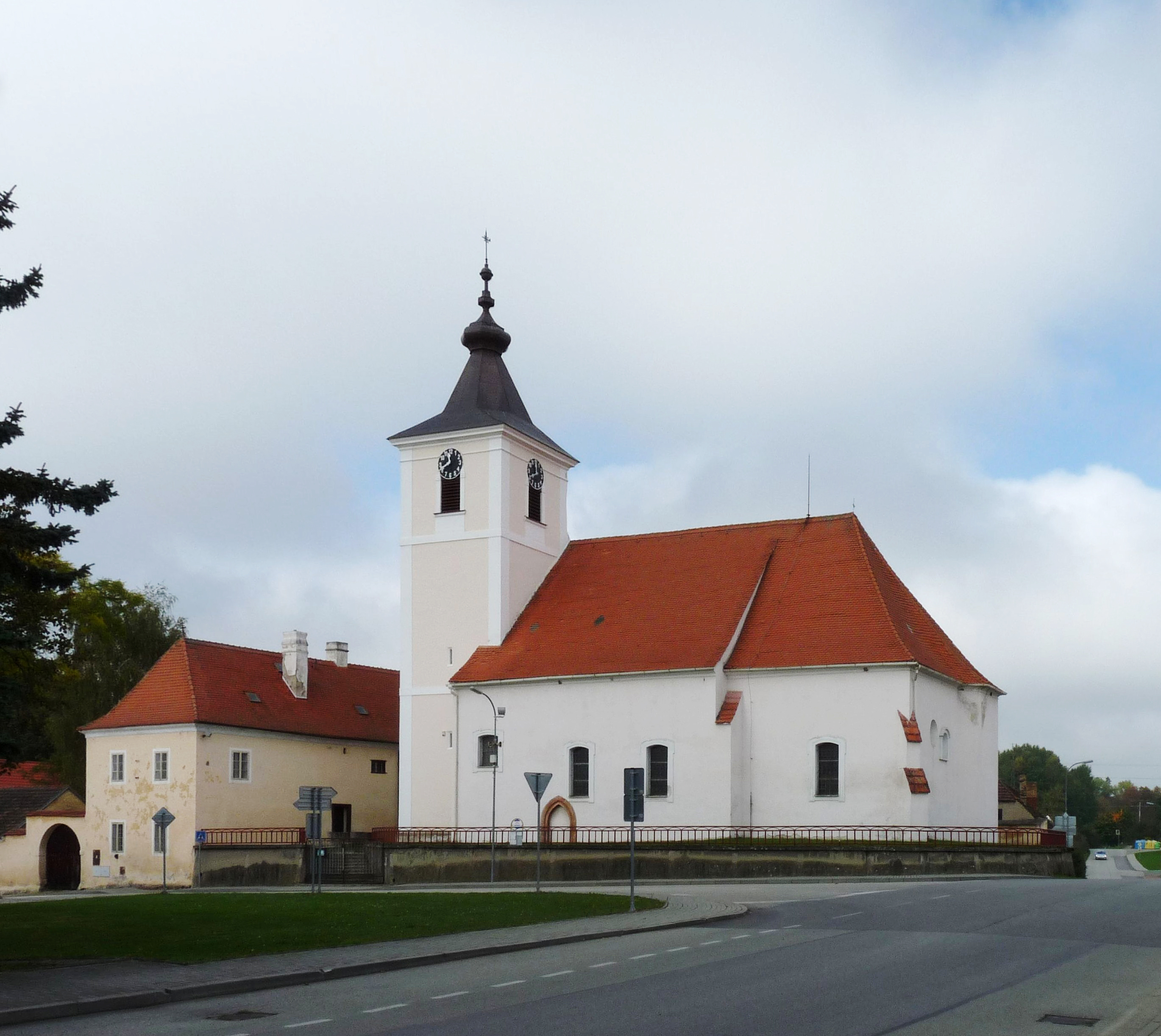
- Church of the Annunciation of the Virgin Mary

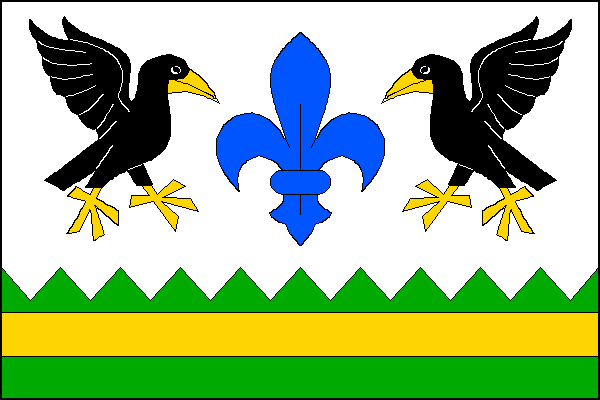
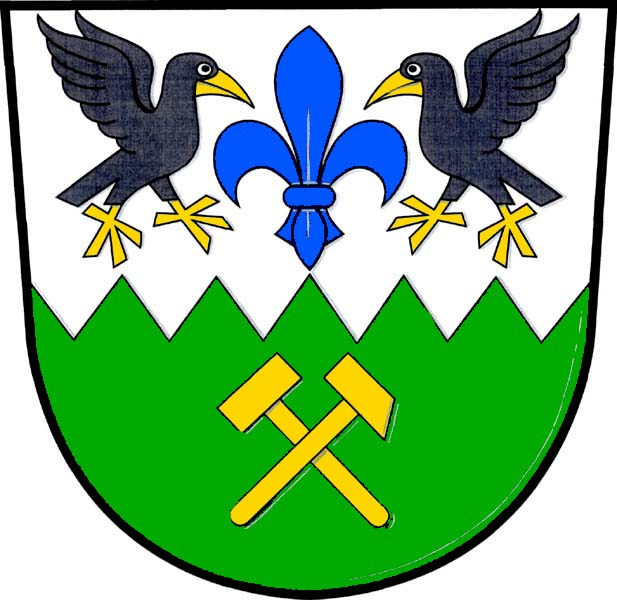
- Flag Coat of arms

- Location in the Czech Republic
- Coordinates: 49°5′23″N 14°22′15″E
- Country: Czech Republic
- Region: South Bohemian
- District: České Budějovice
- First mentioned: 1352

Area
  - Total: 4.50 km^{2} (1.74 sq mi)
- Elevation: 407 m (1,335 ft)

Population (2026-01-01)
  - Total: 458
  - Density: 102/km^{2} (264/sq mi)
- Time zone: UTC+1 (CET)
  - Summer (DST): UTC+2 (CEST)
- Postal code: 373 48
- Website: www.zahaji.cz

Zahájí is a municipality and village in České Budějovice District in the South Bohemian Region of the Czech Republic. It has about 500 inhabitants.

== History ==
The first written mention of Zahájí is from 1352, when the village was called Vavřinčice. The name Zahájí first appeared in 1399 and has been used ever since.

Zahájí is known for the Battle of Sahay, which was a small battle between French and Austrians in 1742, during the War of the Austrian Succession.

== Demographics ==
Historical population
Year	Pop.	±%
1869	293	—
1880	271	−7.5%
1890	333	+22.9%
1900	386	+15.9%
1910	378	−2.1%
1921	415	+9.8%
1930	435	+4.8%
1950	424	−2.5%
1961	441	+4.0%
1970	416	−5.7%
1980	414	−0.5%
1991	370	−10.6%
2001	355	−4.1%
2011	461	+29.9%
2021	468	+1.5%
Source: Censuses
