= Battle of Sahay =

18th century military conflict

Coordinates: 49°5′35″N 14°22′29″E

- Part of the War of the Austrian Succession
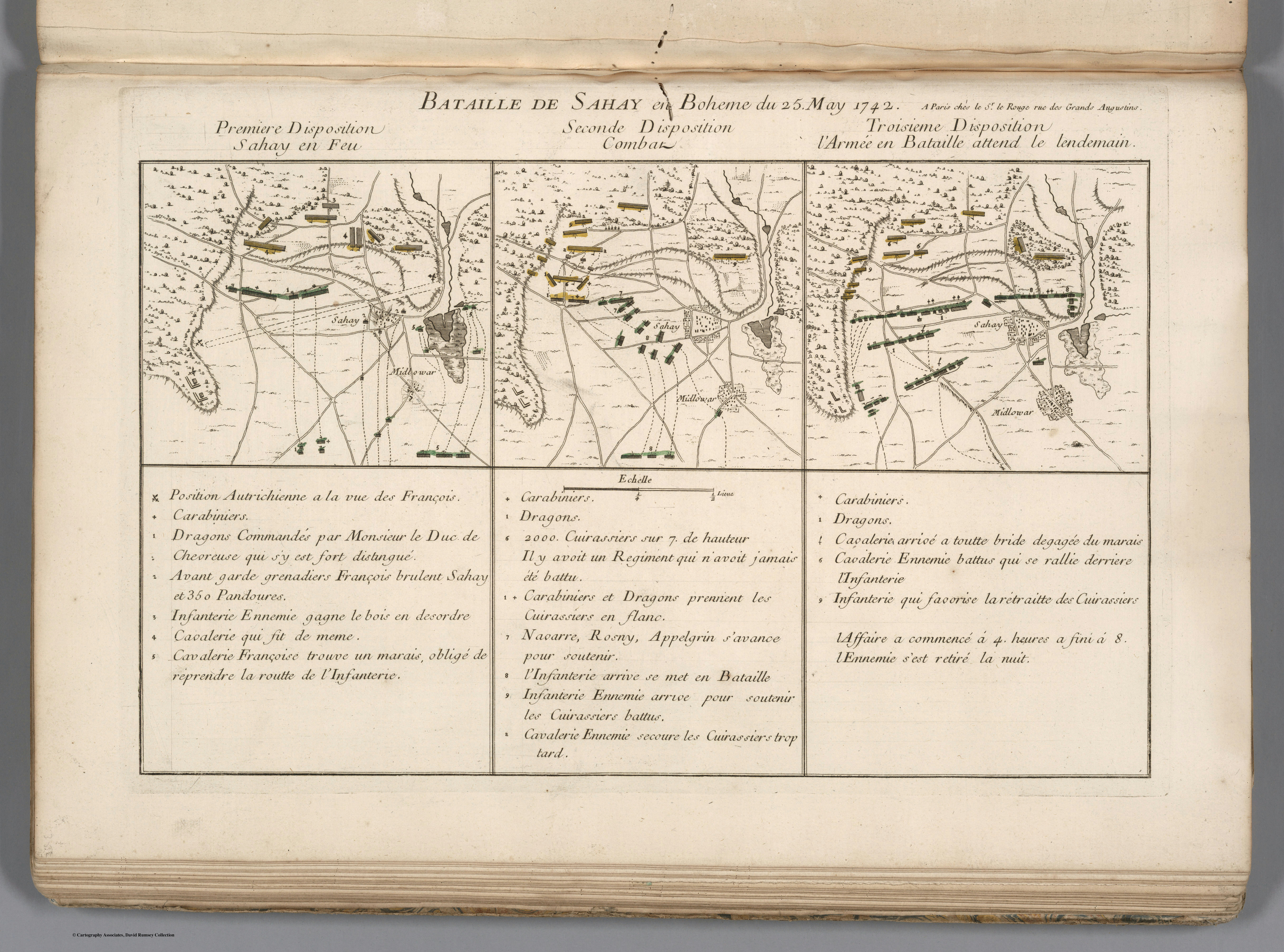
- French map of the battle of Sahay by Georges-Louis Le Rouge (c. 1745)
Date	24 May 1742
Location	Zahájí, southern Bohemia
Result	French victory

Belligerents
Austria	France

Commanders and leaders
(Habsburg monarchy) Prince Lobkowicz	(Kingdom of France) Duc de Broglie (Kingdom of France) Duc de Belle-Isle

Strength
10,000	

Casualties and losses
500	250

The Battle of Sahay or Zahájí was fought on 24 May 1742 near village of Zahájí, about 15 km (10 mi) northwest of České Budějovice in southern Bohemia, between the French under the Duc de Broglie and the Austrians under Lobkowicz. The battle was part of the War of the Austrian Succession and was conducted in cooperation with the Prussians under Frederick the Great who had defeated the Austrians a week previously at the battle of Chotusitz. Broglie won a small, but politically important, victory which combined with Frederick's success at Chotusitz disposed Maria Theresa to cede Silesia in the Treaty of Breslau on 11 June 1742.

== Preliminary maneuvers ==
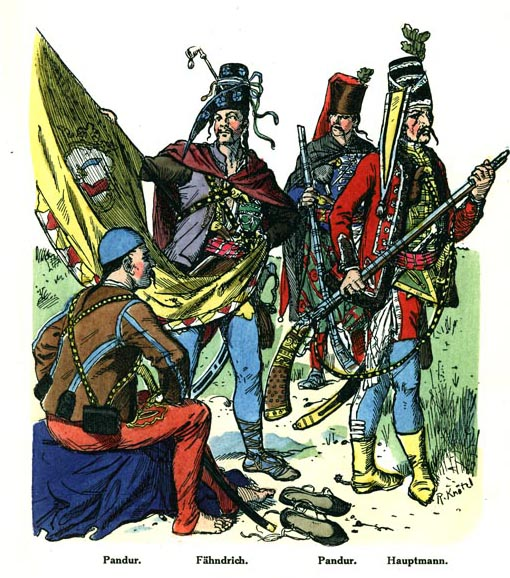
Croatian pandurs from 1742

Lobkowicz marched on an advanced French post at Hluboká nad Vltavou and investing it on 18 May began a bombardment with twelve cannon and some mortars. Broglie, joined by Belle-Isle on 19 May, moved to relieve the post.

== Battle ==
The engagement began at about four in the afternoon. The Austrians were drawn up in line of battle with their left on the village of Zahájí which they occupied with 300 Pandur irregular light infantry. Their left was covered by some swampy ground with woods on a height to their right and rear. The French, with superior numbers, pressed the attack. They attempted to flank the marsh with some cavalry and attacked Sahay with an advanced guard of grenadiers, driving the Pandours from the village which they set on fire to cover their retreat.

The Austrians fell back to the woods in disorder but recovered and counter-attacked. A cavalry charge by three regiments of Austrian cuirassiers was launched from some rising ground in front of the woods against the French Carabiniers who were supported by two dragoon regiments. The French cavalry flanked the Austrian cavalry and the Austrians were repulsed. The infantry on both sides attacked each other but the French pushed the Austrians back to the woods. The French regiment Navarre making three bayonet charges. The Austrian cavalry rallied behind the infantry and charged again but were again forced back with the Hohenzollern cuirassiers distinguishing themselves but suffering severely.

The battle ended around eight in the evening with the Austrians retreating during the night losing some 500 killed and six cannon. The French losses were about 250.
