= Pierre Dupont de l'Étang =

French army officer and politician

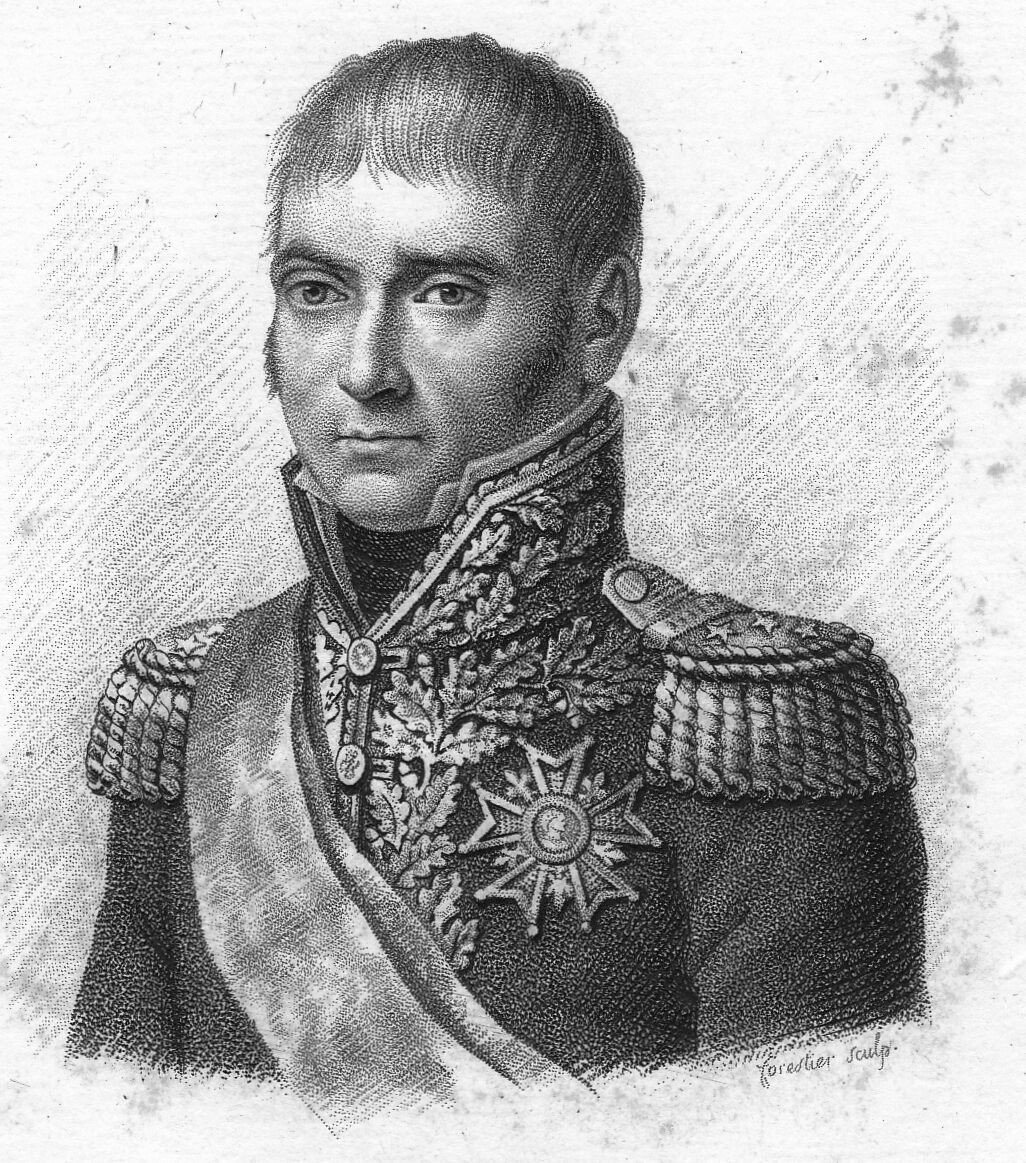
- Portrait of Dupont

Minister of State
- In office 19 December 1815 – July 1830

Minister of War
- In office 3 March 1814 – 3 December 1814
- Preceded by: Henri Clarke, duc de Feltre
- Succeeded by: Jean-de-Dieu Soult

Deputy of Charente
- In office 1815–1830

Personal details
- Born: 4 July 1765 Chabanais, France
- Died: 9 March 1840 (aged 74) Paris, France
- Awards: Grand Cross of the Legion of Honour

Military service
- Allegiance: Dutch Republic; Kingdom of France; First French Republic; First French Empire
- Branch/service: Dutch States Army; French Royal Army; French Revolutionary Army; French Imperial Army
- Rank: Divisional-General
- Battles/wars: French Revolutionary Wars; Battle of Valmy; Campaigns of 1793; Campaigns of 1800; Battle of Marengo; Battle of Pozzolo; Napoleonic Wars; War of the Third Coalition; Battle of Haslach-Jungingen; Battle of Dürenstein; War of the Fourth Coalition; Battle of Friedland; Peninsular War; Battle of Bailén (POW)

Divisional-General Pierre-Antoine, comte Dupont de l'Étang (4 July 1765 – 9 March 1840) was a French army officer and politician who served in the French Revolutionary and Napoleonic Wars.

== Life ==
=== Revolutionary Wars ===
Born in Chabanais, Charente, Dupont first saw active service during the French Revolutionary Wars as a member of the Légion de Maillebois in the Netherlands, and in 1791 was on the staff of the Army of the North under General Théobald Dillon.

He distinguished himself in the Battle of Valmy, and in the fighting around Menen in the campaign of 1793 he forced an Austrian regiment to surrender. Promoted to brigadier general for this accomplishment, he soon received further advancement from Lazare Carnot, who recognized his abilities. In 1797, he became général de division.

The rise of Napoleon Bonaparte, whom he supported in the Coup of 18 Brumaire (November 1799), brought him further opportunities under the Consulate and Empire. In the campaign of 1800 he was chief of staff to Louis-Alexandre Berthier, the nominal commander of the Army of Peierve of the Ains which won the Battle of Marengo. After the battle he sustained a successful combat, against greatly superior forces, at Pozzolo.

=== Napoleonic Wars ===
In the campaign on the Danube in 1805, as the leader of one of Michel Ney's divisions, Dupont earned further distinction, especially in the Battle of Haslach-Jungingen (Albeck), in which he prevented the escape of the Austrians from Ulm, and so contributed most effectively to the isolation and subsequent capture of Karl Mack von Leiberich and his whole army. He also distinguished himself in the Battle of Friedland.

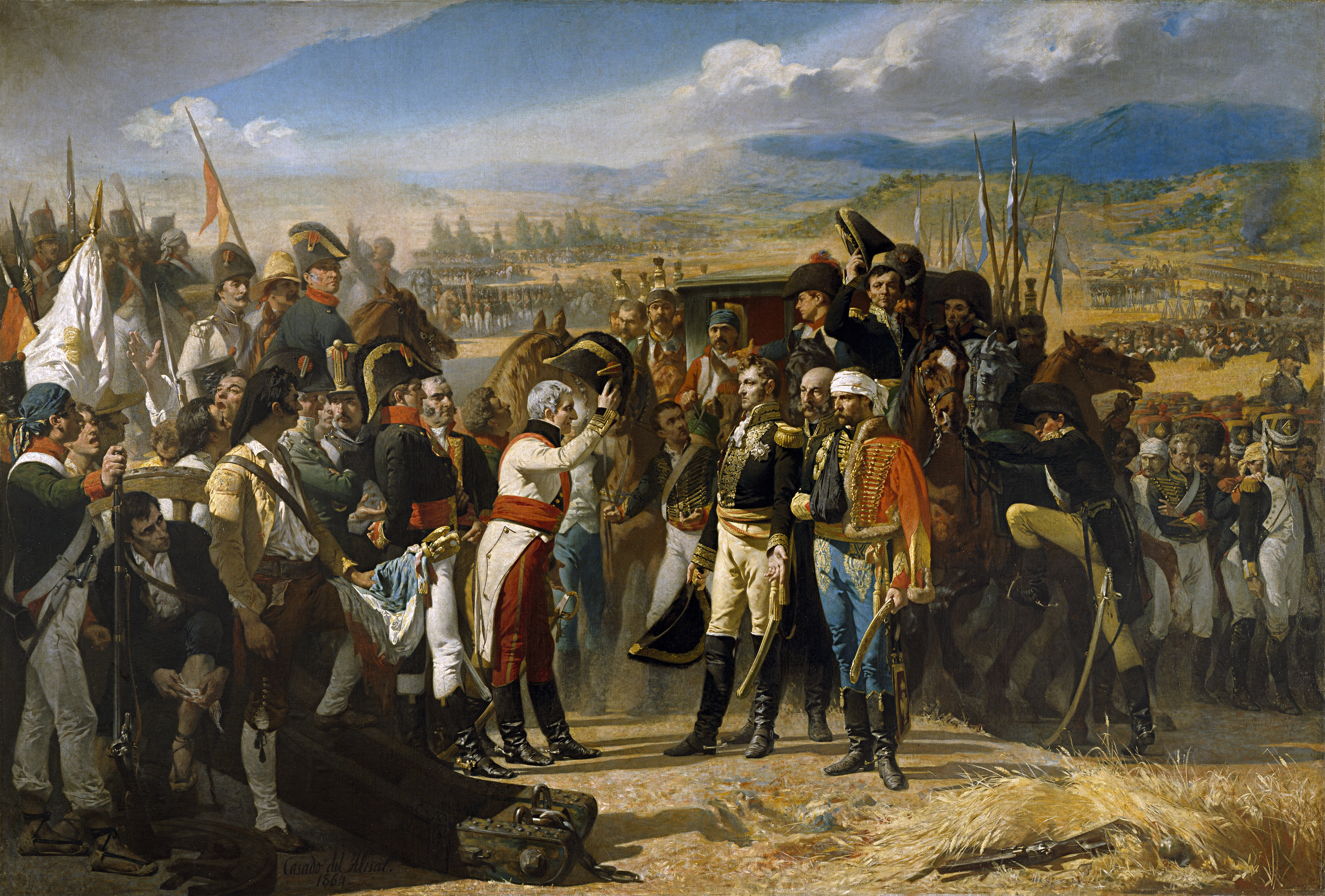
The Surrender of Bailén by José Casado del Alisal, 1864

With a record such as but few of Napoleon's divisional commanders possessed, he entered Spain in 1808 at the head of a motley corps made up of provisional battalions and Swiss troops impressed into French service from the Spanish Royal Army (see Peninsular War). After the occupation of Madrid, Dupont, newly created count by Napoleon, was sent with his force to subdue Andalusia. After a few initial successes he had to retire toward the passes of the Sierra Morena. Pursued and cut off by a Spanish army under the Captain General Castaños, his corps was defeated in the Battle of Bailén after his Swiss troops deserted and returned to their former allegiance. Painfully wounded in the hip, Dupont felt constrained to capitulate. Even so, Dupont sent secret orders to General Dominique Vedel to escape with his division, which was outside the Spanish trap. When the Spanish found out, they threatened to massacre Dupont's men if Vedel did not also surrender, which Vedel did. Altogether 17,600 French soldiers laid down their arms in the disaster. Madrid fell to the resurgent Spanish forces and this soon compelled Napoleon to intervene with his Grand Army in order to salvage the situation.

=== Disgrace and Bourbon Restoration ===
Dupont fell into the emperor's disgrace, as it was not taken into account that his troops were for the most part raw levies and that ill-luck contributed materially to the catastrophe. After his return to France, Dupont was sent before a court-martial, deprived of his rank and title, and imprisoned at Fort de Joux from 1812 to 1814.

Released only by the initial Restoration, he was employed by Louis XVIII in a military command, which he lost on the return of Napoleon during the Hundred Days. But the Second Restoration saw him reinstated to the army and appointed a member of the conseil privé of Louis XVIII. Between April and December 1814, he was Minister of War, but his reactionary politics made the monarch recall him. From 1815 to 1830, Dupont was deputy for the Charente.

== Death ==
He lived in retirement from 1832, working on his memoirs until his death in 1840. He lies buried in Père Lachaise Cemetery.

== Duellist ==
An episode in the life of Pierre Dupont de l'Étang inspired the novel The Duel by Joseph Conrad (1908), which was turned into the film The Duellists, by Ridley Scott.

In The Encyclopedia of the Sword, Nick Evangelista wrote:

As a young officer in Napoleon's Army, Dupont was ordered to deliver a disagreeable message to a fellow officer, Fournier, a rabid duellist. Fournier, taking out his subsequent rage on the messenger, challenged Dupont to a duel. This sparked a succession of encounters, waged with sword and duelling pistol, that spanned decades. The contest was eventually resolved when Dupont was able to overcome Fournier in a pistol duel, forcing him to promise never to bother him again.

Dupont was the model for Armand d'Hubert, played by Keith Carradine in the film. Over a period of roughly 20 years, Dupont de l'Étang fought a series of more than 20 duels with his fellow officer, the particularly quarrelsome Fournier, nicknamed by the Spaniards el demonio (Gabriel Féraud, in the film, and played by Harvey Keitel).

== Personal life ==
Pierre Dupont was married on 26 December 1804 to Jeanne Grâce Bergon, daughter of a state counsellor, who died in the château des Ternes (Paris) on 13 June 1858. They had two children:

- Jean Pierre Théophile, comte Dupont; born in Paris 23 February 1806, died 6 May 1843, married 22 July 1837 to Adele Lidorie Bickham (born in Mauritius 17 October 1808, died Paris 18 November 1841), parents of Arthur, comte Dupont born in Paris 10 May 1839.
- Claire Joséphine Grace Dupont; married to Eugène Panon Desbassayns de Richemont, comte de Richemont.

He also had an illegitimate son, Aimé Dupont (born 1790 in Maastricht), who became a colonel of engineers.

His niece Claire Grâce Dupont de Savignat was the mother of Marie François Sadi Carnot, President of the Republic.

== Writings ==
=== Military treatises ===
- Opinion sur le nouveau mode de recrutement (1818)
- Lettres sur l'Espagne en 1808 (1823)
- Lettre sur la campagne d'Autriche (1826)

=== Other ===
- Poems, including La Liberté (1799), Cathelinna ou les amis rivaux (1801), L'Art de la guerre, poème en dix chants (1838), and verse translations from Horace and Homer (1836).
- At the time of his death he was on the point of publishing his memoirs.

== Sources ==
- Glover, Michael. The Peninsular War 1807–1814. Penguin, 1974.
- Smith, Digby. The Napoleonic Wars Data Book. Greenhill, 1998.
- Bicentenario de la Batalla de Bailen
- Dictionnaire Bouillet, 1869

Political offices
Preceded by Henri Clarke, duc de Feltre	Minister of War; 3 April 1814 – 3 December 1814	Succeeded by Jean-de-Dieu Soult
