= Coq =

Coq, CoQ, coq or COQ may refer to:

- coq, ISO 639-3 code for Coquille, a dialect of the Tututni language
- Coq, the French word for "rooster" or "cock"
- Coq, an interactive theorem prover, renamed to Rocq in 2025
- CoQ, common term for Coenzyme Q10, a naturally occurring biochemical cofactor and antioxidant produced by the human body
- CoQ, abbreviation for Caves of Qud, a role-playing video game released in 2015
- CoQ, abbreviation for cost of quality
- The Coq, colloquial term for the Coquihalla Highway in British Columbia, Canada

== See also ==
- Coquihalla (disambiguation) (abbreviated: Coq)
- France national Australian rules football team (nicknamed: Coqs)
- Le Coq (disambiguation)
- Coq d'Or (disambiguation)
- Coq au vin
- Cock (disambiguation)
