= Glishorn =

Mountain in Switzerland

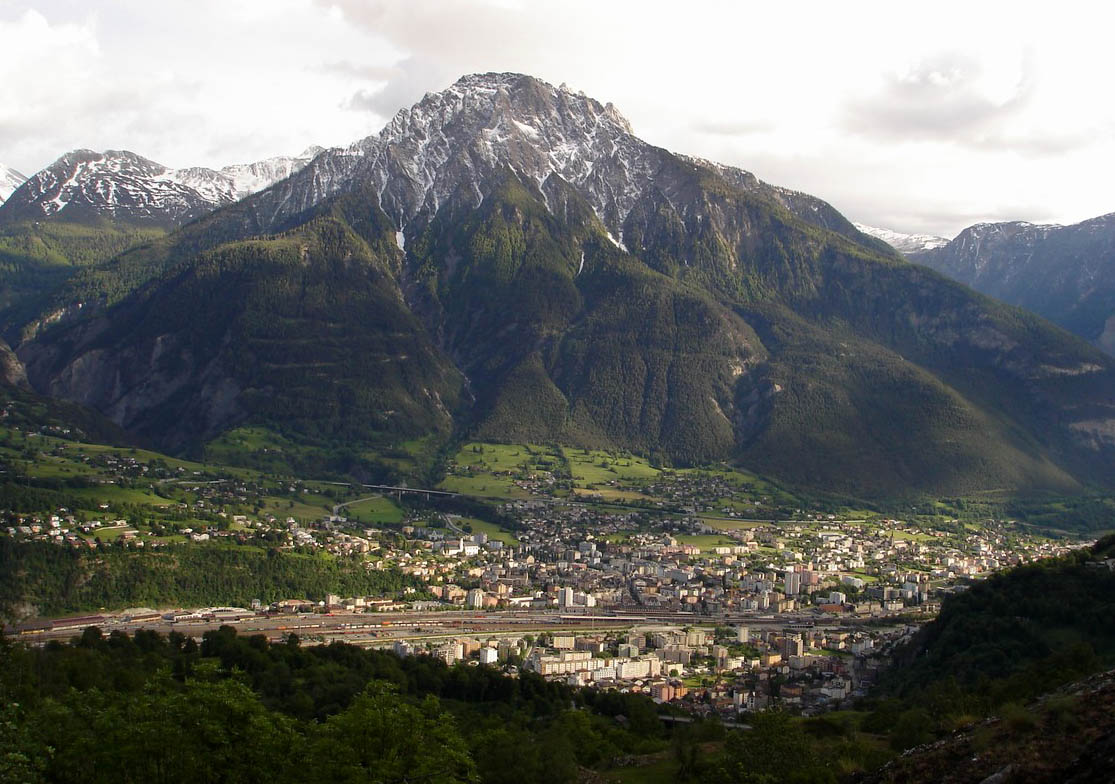
- The Glishorn above Brig-Glis (north side)

Highest point
- Elevation: 2,525 m (8,284 ft)
- Prominence: 46 m (151 ft)
- Parent peak: Spitzhorli
- Coordinates: 46°17′1.6″N 7°59′29.4″E

Geography
- Location within Switzerland
- Location: Valais, Switzerland
- Parent range: Pennine Alps

The Glishorn is a mountain of the Pennine Alps, overlooking Brig-Glis in the canton of Valais.
