= Willi Dreesen =

Swiss painter and sculptor

- Born: Wilhelm Dreesen; 16 February 1928; Essen-Werden, Germany
- Died: 5 January 2013 (aged 84); Brig-Glis, Switzerland
- Education: Folkwang Universitat der Kunste, Essen, Germany
- Known for: Art, abstract expressionism
- Notable work: Konzert Oper Ballet (1967), Woman, acrylic paint (1999)
- Movement: Paintings, constructions photography, collage, Abstract Expressionism

Willi Dreesen (16 February 1928 – 5 January 2013) was a Swiss painter and sculptor.

== Personal life ==
Dreesen was born on 16 February 1928 in Essen-Werden, Germany. In 1944, at the age of 16, Dreesen was drafted into the German airplane defense. He escaped from his assignment and fled into the Zillertal in the Austrian Alps. There he was arrested by German state security, transferred to a war tribunal in Holzkirchen, and sent to the concentration camp in Dachau for 3 months until the end of World War II. In 1952, Dreesen crossed through Germany on a bicycle into southern Switzerland. From 1957-1967 Dreesen resided in the Swiss mountain towns of Riederalp and Goppisberg. From there, he traveled throughout Switzerland, Hamburg, Barcelona, the Canary Islands (Tenerife), and Senegal. In 1967, Dreesen moved to Brig-Glis, Switzerland, where he took residency in the art studio previously occupied by Alfred Gruenwald. In 1971, he married Vreny Kuhnis, with whom he had 2 sons, Stephan and Oliver. Dreesen lived and worked in Brig-Glis until his death on 5 January 2013.

== Artistic career and exhibitions ==
Dreesen began his apprenticeship as a painter in Germany in 1946. As a child, he developed a keen interest in painting, which included landscapes and portraits. In 1948, Dreesen was admitted to the Folkwang Universitat der Kunste, Essen, Germany and commenced his studies in fine arts. As an adult, Dreesen worked at night painting houses and apartments in war-torn Germany to finance his studies and travels. He moved to Switzerland in 1952. Throughout the late 1960s and 1970s, Dreesen exhibited his work in various galleries throughout the region.

- Galerie "zur Matze", Stockalper Castle, Brig.
- Galerie "Taugwalder", Zermatt, 1970.
- Galerie "zur Matze", Brig, 1974.
- Galerie "vor der Klostermauer", St. Gallen, 1976.
- Galerie "zur Schutzenlaube", Visp, Switzerland, 1980 .
- Galerie "zur Schutzenlaube", Visp, Switzerland, 1982 .
- GSMBA exhibition, Steg, 1984 .
- Galerie "zur Schutzenlaube, Visp, Switzerland, 1985.
- Galerie "zur Matze", Brig, Switzerland, 1988 (in celebration of his 60 birthday) .

During this early period, Dreesen used mostly acrylic paints, oil-based materials, and charcoal-based materials. Throughout this period, his paintings depicted mountain scenery and portraits of various regional characters. In the mid to late 1980s, Dreesen's style shifted towards abstract expressionism. He also started creating wooden sculptures and constructions.
