= Le Coq =

Le Coq (French for The Rooster or The Cock) may refer to:

== Persons ==
- Robert le Coq (died 1373), French bishop and councillor
- Karl Ludwig von Le Coq (1754–1829) of French Huguenot ancestry, first joined the army of the Electorate of Saxony, later transferred his loyalty to the Kingdom of Prussia and fought Napoleonic Wars
- Karl Christian Erdmann von Le Coq (1767–1830), a Saxon officer who rose to rank lieutenant-general during the Napoleonic Wars and was the commanding officer of the Royal Saxon army
- Albert von Le Coq (1860–1930), German archaeologist and explorer of Central Asia
- Bernard Le Coq (born 1950), French actor
- Pierre Le Coq (born 1989), French competitive sailor

== Other ==
- A. Le Coq, Estonian brewery
- Le Coq Musique, record label based in the UK
- Le Coq Sportif, French sports equipment and apparel manufacturer
- Lilleküla Stadium, also known as A. Le Coq Arena
- TTÜ-A. Le Coq (1989-2002), former Estonian professional basketball club
- TTÜ/A. Le Coq (2000-2004), former Estonian professional basketball club

== See also ==
- Lecoq
- De Haan (disambiguation)
  - De Haan, Belgium, known in French as "Le Coq"
