= Brig-Glis =

- Municipality
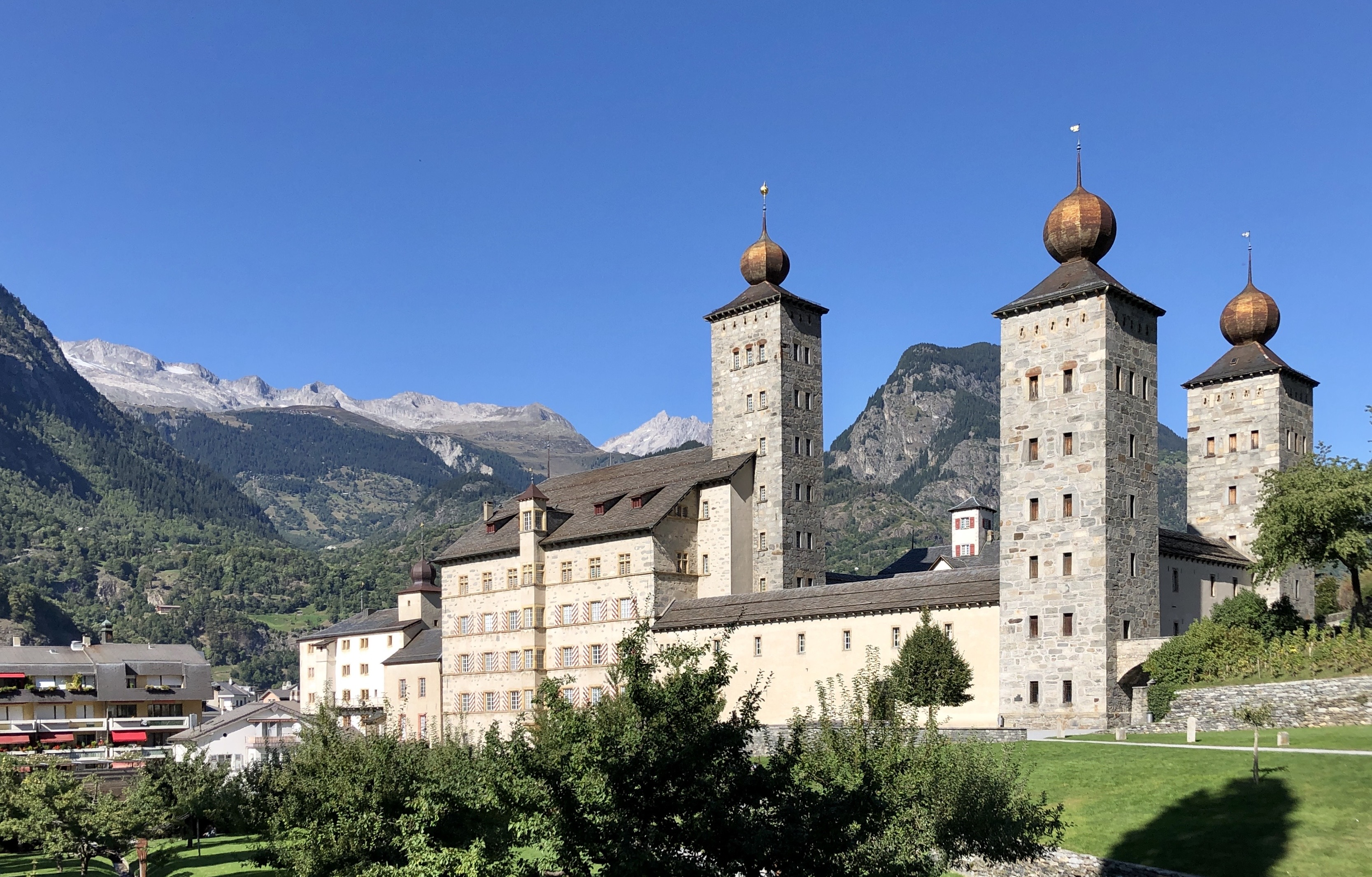
- Stockalper Palace

- Flag Coat of arms
- Location of Brig-Glis
- Location within Switzerland Location within Canton of Valais
- Coordinates: 46°19′N 7°58′E
- Country: Switzerland
- Canton: Valais
- District: Brig

Government
  - Executive: Stadtrat with 7 members
  - Mayor: Stadtpräsident (list); Mathias Bellwald FDP/PRD (as of 2021)
  - Parliament: none (Urversammlung)

Area
  - Total: 38.0 km^{2} (14.7 sq mi)
- Elevation: 691 m (2,267 ft)

Population (December 2002)
  - Total: 11,882
  - Density: 313/km^{2} (810/sq mi)
- Demonym(s): German: Briger(in), Gliser(in)
- Time zone: UTC+01:00 (CET)
  - Summer (DST): UTC+02:00 (CEST)
- Postal code: 3900
- SFOS number: 6002
- ISO 3166 code: CH-VS
- Localities: Brig, Glis, Gamsen, Brigerbad
- Surrounded by: Lalden, Mund, Naters, Ried-Brig, Simplon, Termen, Visp, Visperterminen
- Twin towns: Langenthal (Switzerland), Domodossola (Italy)
- Website: www.brig-glis.ch

Brig, officially Brig-Glis (French: Brigue-Glis; Italian: Briga-Glis), is a historic town and municipality in the district of Brig in the canton of Valais in Switzerland. The current municipality was formed in 1972 through the merger of Brig (city), Brigerbad and Glis.

Together with other Alpine towns, Brig-Glis engages in the Alpine Town of the Year Association for the implementation of the Alpine Convention to achieve sustainable development in the Alpine Arc. Brig-Glis was awarded Alpine Town of the Year 2008.

== History ==
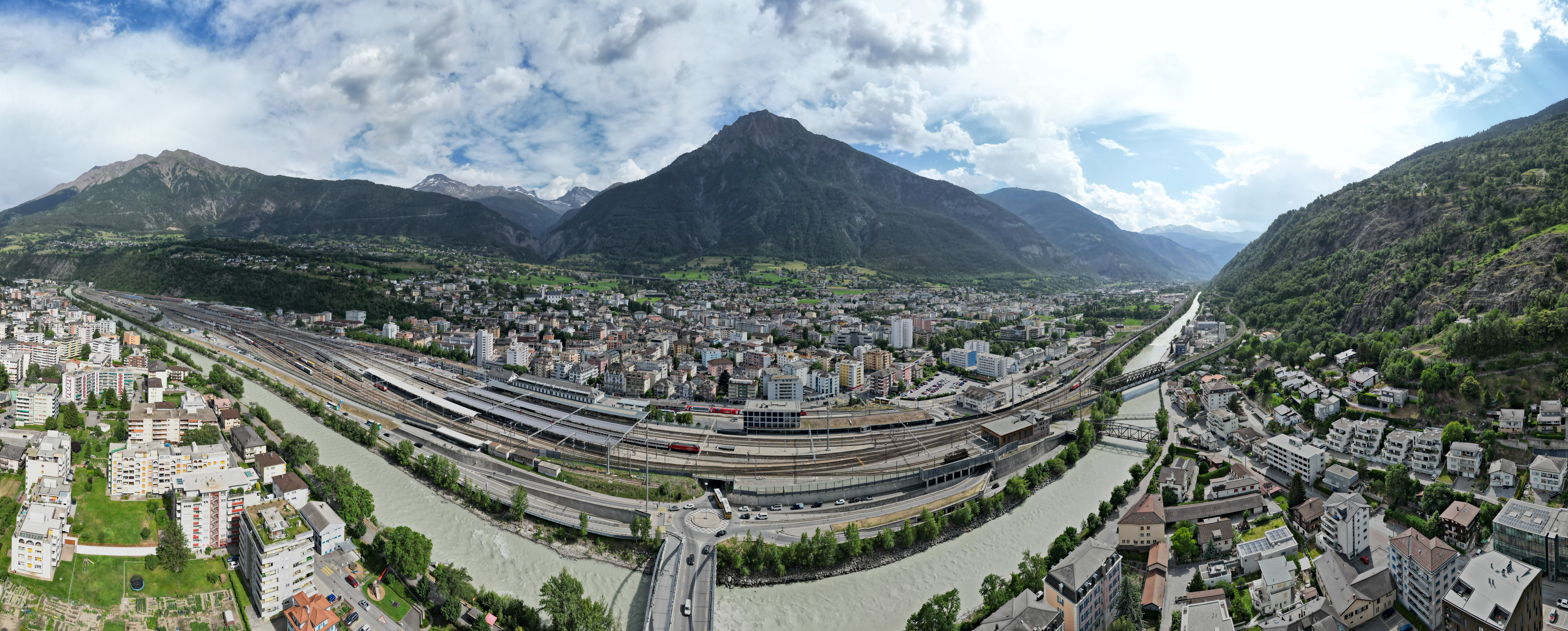
Brig aerial panorama (June 2022)

The name Brig is derived from Briva, or "bridge". Its older houses are very Italian in appearance, while its most prominent buildings (Stockalper Palace, former Jesuits' college and Ursuline convent) all date from the 17th century, and are due to the generosity of a single member of the local Stockalper family, the baron Kaspar Stockalper.

The prosperity of Brig is bound up with the Simplon Pass, so that it gradually supplanted the more ancient village of Naters opposite, becoming a separate parish (the church is at Glis, a few minutes from the town) in 1517. Its medieval name was Briga dives. The opening of the carriage road across the Simplon (1807) and of the tunnel beneath the pass (1906), as well as the fact that above Brig is the steeper and less fertile portion of the Upper Valais (then much frequented by tourists), greatly increased the importance and size of the town.

=== Brig ===
Brig is first mentioned in 1215 as Briga. The first evidence of human habitation near Brig comes from a few Bronze Age objects, a bracelet and a dagger. The area remained inhabited through the Latène era with scattered Walser settlements. During the Roman era the Roman influence was strongest along the Roman road on the valley floor. The area remained settled during the Iron Age, Migration Period and Early Middle Ages.

The De Briga family is first mentioned in 1215. The family was probably a branch of the Mangoldi line which was first mentioned in 1181 and is probably identical to the De Curia (im Hof) family which appeared between 1308 and 1335. The family seat was the Höllenburg, which was a tower above Brig. By the 17th century, the tower had been demolished. It is likely that the city was founded by the Bishop of Sion, when they built a tower and curtain wall in the 12th century. The original tower was replaced with a new tower in the 13th century, which was demolished in 1970.

In the 14th century, Brig was first mentioned as a town. It grew in importance and in 1518 became the capital of the Zenden (a term for a district in Valais) of Brig. Together with the capital, it became the seat of the district court. The town hall is first mentioned in 1618. The city wall also served as a flood wall to help protect the town from the Saltina, which often flooded. The nearby Rhône caused floods in 1469, 1506, 1640, 1752, 1775, 1868 and 1920. In 1755 and again in 1855 an earthquake damaged the city. The plague decimated the population in 1465, 1475, 1485 and 1575. In 1799 French troops pillaged the city, burned the archives and inflicted great damage.

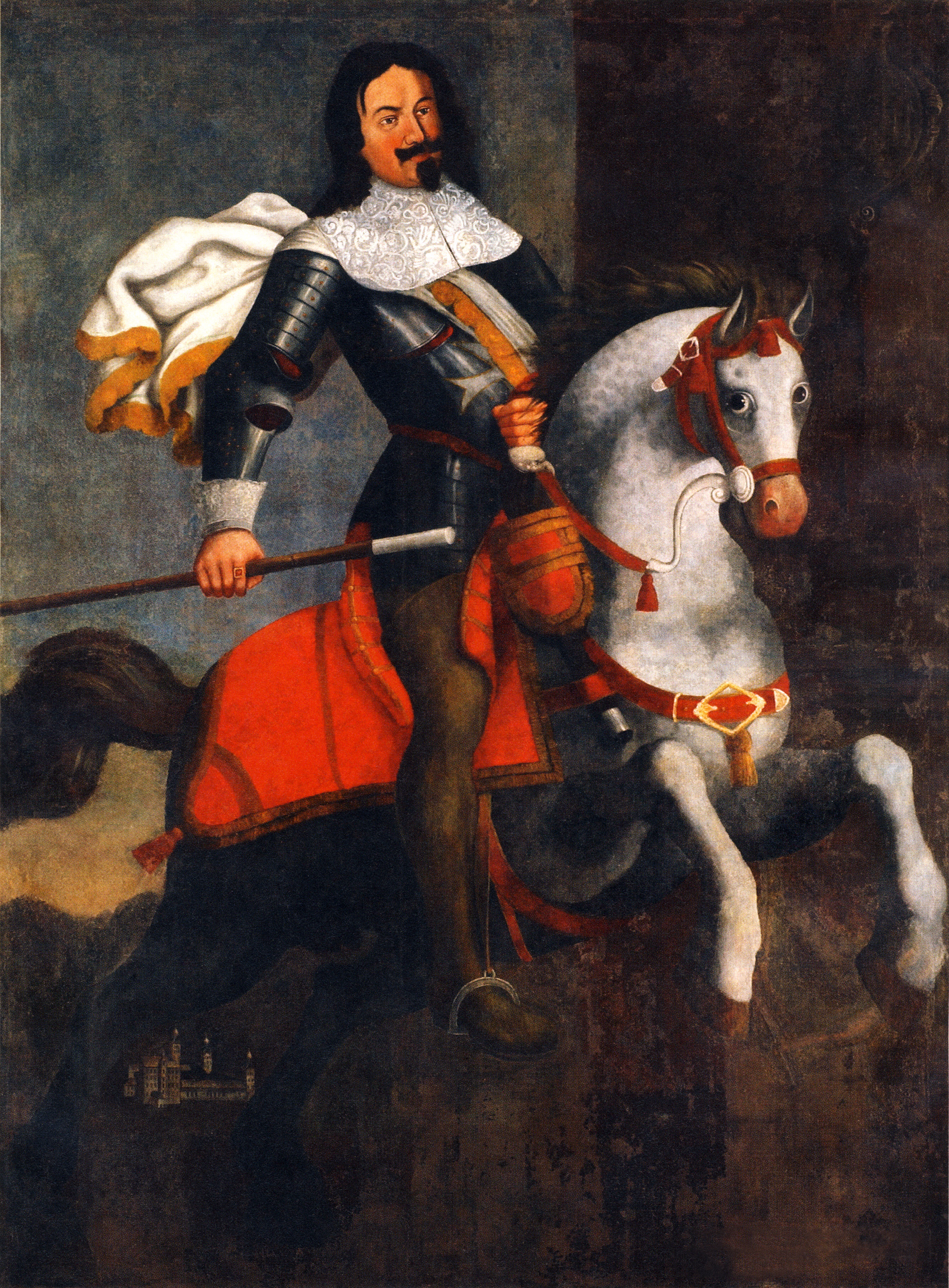
Kaspar Stockalper

Historic aerial photograph by Werner Friedli from 1949

Starting in the middle of the 13th century, it was a storage, transhipment and customs station for transportation over the Simplon Pass. By the early modern era a number of families were wealthy from trade and built palatial homes and public buildings in the city. The Renaissance tower of the Provincial Governor Kaspar Metz Elten was built in 1526. Then, in 1658–1678, Kaspar Stockalper built the Stockalper Palace with three towers, an arcaded courtyard and a park. The early modern city also featured the old Stockalper house (ca. 1533), the Salzhof (16th century, demolished 1967) which served as a transhipment and storage point, the patrician houses of Wegener (17th century), Mannhaft (1709) and Fernanda de Stockalper (1727). Outside the city, in 1677, Kaspar Stockalper built the Matteni manor house for Georg Christoph Mannhaft.

Brig originally belonged to the large parish of Naters until 1642 when it became part of the parish of Glis. Brig became its own parish in 1957 and built a parish church in 1967–1970. In 1624–1627, the Jesuits established a branch in the town. Between 1662 and 1773 and again between 1814 and 1847, they ran a college in the town. The college was built from 1663 to 1673 followed by the college church from 1673 to 1687. Between 1773 and 1814 the college was administered by the Piarists. From 1848 it was operated by the canton of Valais; until 1990 the rector was a lay priest. The first Capuchin monastery was built between 1650 and 1660, but the existing monastery is from 1947 to 1948. An Ursuline convent was founded in 1661 with a girls' school and the Ursuline Church dates from 1732. Since 1937 it has been the mission house (and sometimes a seminary) of the Mariannhill Missionaries. The Anthony hospital was established in 1304. The gothic hospital church was built in the 14th century and the first hospital religious order was founded in 1399. It was later passed to the community and served the town until 1908. The citizenry built the Sebastian Chapel in 1636–1637 and restored it in 1972–1973. In 1951, Karl Schmid built the Wehrmann chapel.

The construction of the new road over the Simplon Pass in 1801–1805, the expansion of the old road between 1949 and 1960, as well as the construction of a national highway starting in 1960, have allowed increasing traffic through Brig. In 1890–1905 stagecoaches transported 152,816 persons to Domodossola over the pass. In 1906 the first car drove over the Simplon. Since 1919, postal buses have run over the pass into Brig. This service expanded from seasonal to year-round in 1970. The first rail line into Brig was finished in 1874 and connected the town to the west by the Rhône Valley. The Lötschberg Tunnel, which opened in 1913, connected Brig to Bern. When the Simplon Tunnel was built in 1906 and the second tunnel was added in 1921, it provided a year-round, reliable rail link with Italy. In 1926, the Furka-Oberalp rail line connected Brig with Disentis in Graubünden. The railway station was built in 1877–1878 and expanded in 1910 with a new building, which also serves as a freight station and border station. The 1910 station was expanded in 1957, 1961 and 1993. In 1859 a telegraph office was built in town, followed by a local telephone network in 1898.

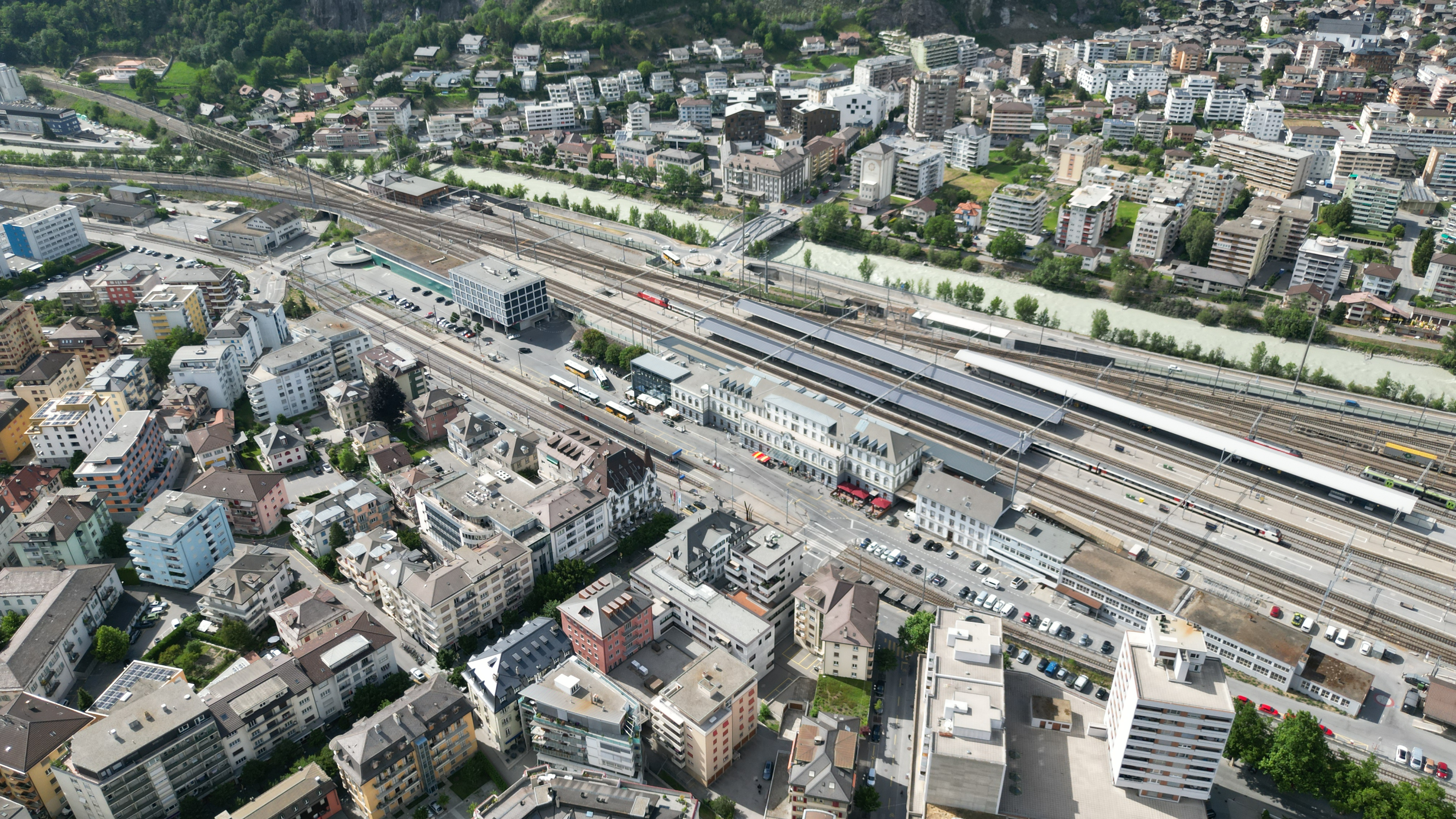
Brig-Glis railway station

As it became easier to travel to Brig, the tourism industry grew. The number of hotel beds in town rose from 120 in 1800, to 425 in 1912 and to 1,000 in 1993. By 2002 the number of beds had dropped to about 820. In 1858 a large sawmill was built in town. This was followed by other smaller industrial companies, including woodworking, pasta production, telephone apparatus, gloves and knitwear. The Brig-Naters power plant was built in 1900 to supply power to the towns and their growing industry. However, in the middle to late 20th century, most of the industrial plants left Brig. In 1990, 81% of the workforce worked in the services or tertiary sector of the economy. Only 18% worked in industry and 1% worked in agriculture. In 2001 there were 7,129 employees in Brig-Glis, working for 803 companies.

=== Glis ===
The oldest traces of human settlements around Glis were discovered in 1992 and included significant traces of settlements from the Bronze and Iron Ages. During the Middle Ages, Glis, Holz and Gamsen formed a municipality in the Zenden. Starting around 1320, the settlement of Wickert (now part of Glis) was a farming estate that belonged to the collegiate church of Sion. In the early 14th century, an earthen wall was built across the Rhône Valley at Gamsen. This wall, portions of which are still visible, was probably built to protect against invasions from Savoy. In 1596, an iron mine was opened near the village. This mine was acquired in 1636, by Kaspar Stockalper.

Until 1642, Glis belonged to the parish of Naters but had been relatively independent in religious matters since the 12th–13th century. The Church of Our Lady on the Glisacker has been a pilgrimage centre of the Upper Valais since the 14th century. Glis was raised to an independent parish in 1642. At that time, the parish included Brig, Brigerbad, Ried-Brig, Termen, Gamsen and Eggerberg. Excavations in and around the church in 1984 discovered an early Christian aisleless church from around 500. The excavations also discovered a baptistery and side rooms and parts of four other churches. The present church, which combines elements of both the Renaissance and the late Gothic period, owes its appearance to Prismell master builders Peter and Christian Bodmer. In the mid-17th century, they completed the plans drawn up in 1519 by Ulrich Ruffiner.

After the Second World War, Glis developed from a farming village into a residential area for Brig. In the merger with Brig, Glis brought a large amount of land and a large industrial company, the explosives factory Société suisse des explosifs which was founded in Gamsen in 1894.

=== Brigerbad ===
Very little is known about the early history of this small village located between the Rhone and the far north side of the valley. There are two buildings in the village that are from the Middle Ages: the tower of Junker von Baden, which may have been built in the 13th century, and the so-called bishops barn, which may date from the 15th century. Brigerbad was always part of the parish of Glis, though they did build a chapel in 1721. The village began to develop local government and law in the 16th and 17th century and the first statutes were written in 1671.

The floods of the Rhone, maintenance of Gamsner bridge (first mentioned in 1395) and the reclamation of the Eyen were commonplace activities from the 13th century until the Rhone Correction in 1873–82.

Brigerbad was known for its hot springs. The village's name literally means "Brig's baths." They were discovered in 1471 by Anton Walker and flourished in the 16th century under Peter Owlig. The thermal hot spring baths began to decay in the 17th century, but were rebuilt in 1934–35 and again in 1956–60.

== Geography ==
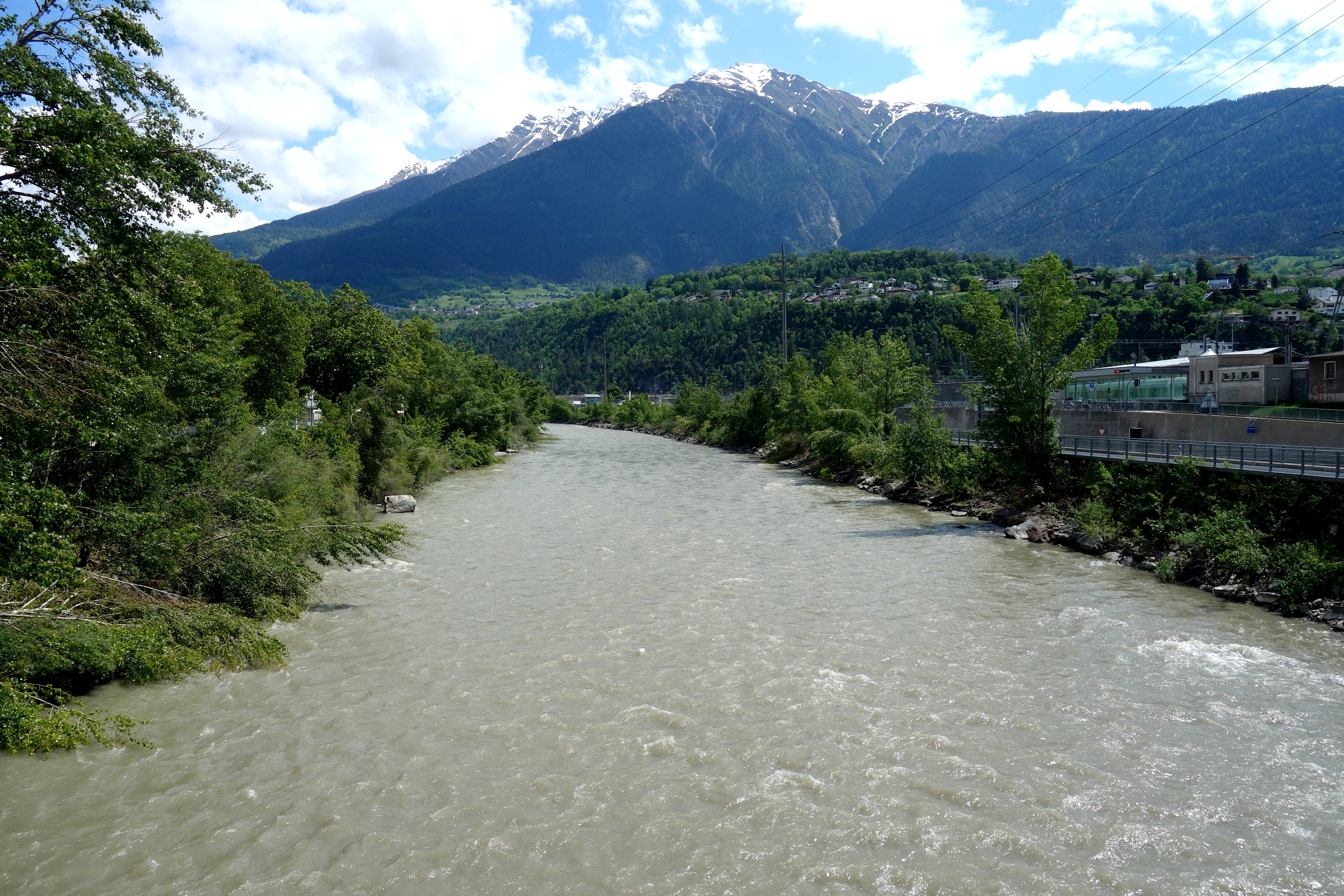
The Rhone in Brig

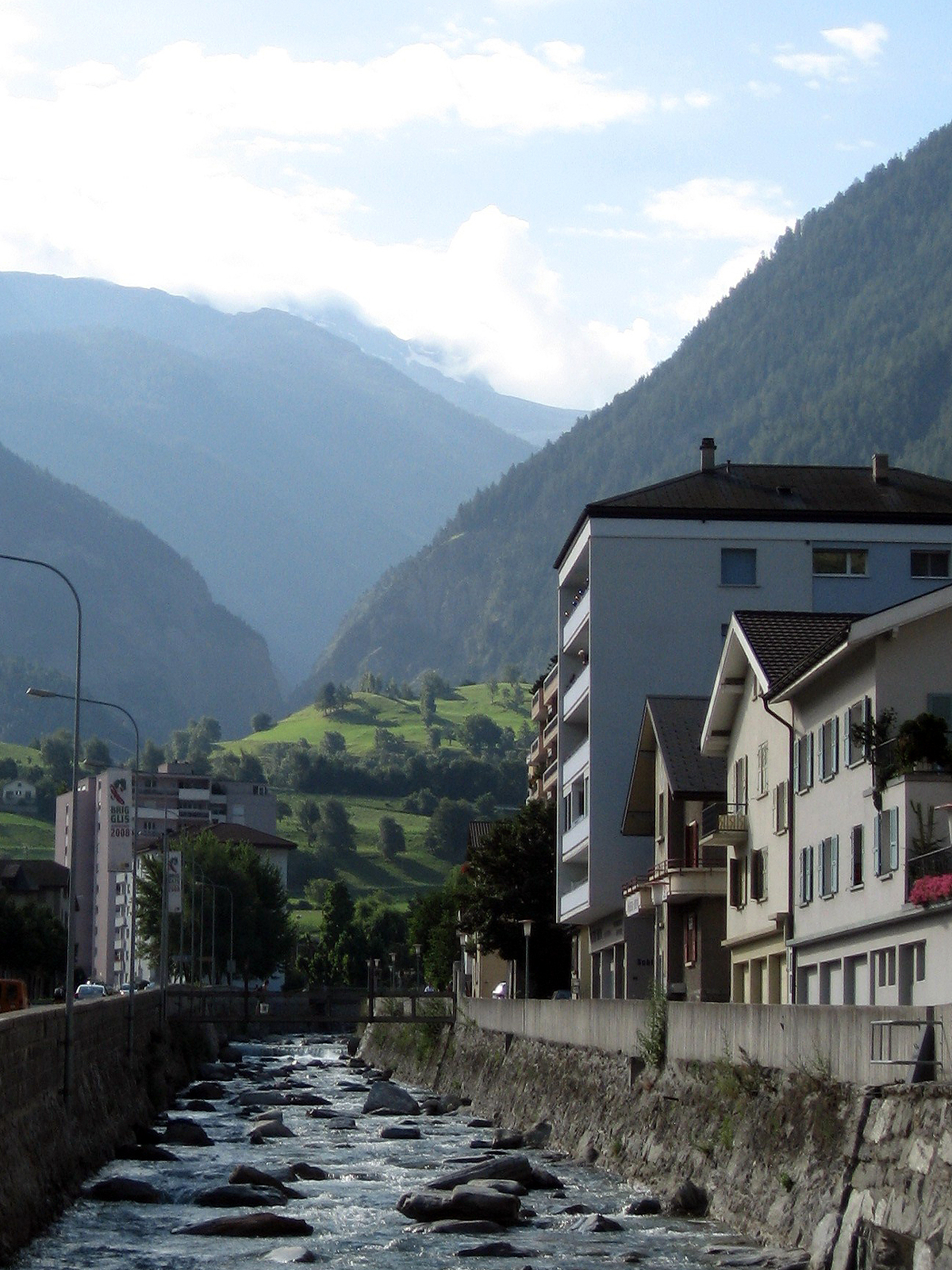
The Saltina in Brig

It is a picturesque small town in Upper Valais, situated at the foot of the northern slope of the Simplon Pass in the Alps, on the right bank of the Saltine stream, and a little above its junction with the Rhone. Brig is surrounded by many high Alpine summits. Within the municipality are the summits of the Glishorn, Spitzhorli and Tochuhorn. Brig is located close to the Swiss-Italian borders.

Brig-Glis had an area, (as of the 2004/09 survey) of 37.67 km^{2} (14.54 sq mi). Of this area, about 11.9% is used for agricultural purposes, while 48.6% is forested. Of the rest of the land, 11.6% is settled (buildings or roads) and 27.9% is unproductive land. Over the past two decades (1979/85-2004/09) the amount of land that is settled has increased by 119 ha (290 acres) and the agricultural land has decreased by 115 ha (280 acres).

== Coat of arms ==
The blazon of the municipal coat of arms is Or, an Eagle with dragon's tail displayed Sable, crowned, beaked, langued, membered and tailed Gules bearing an Escutcheon Gules three Mullets Or in pale.

== Demographics ==
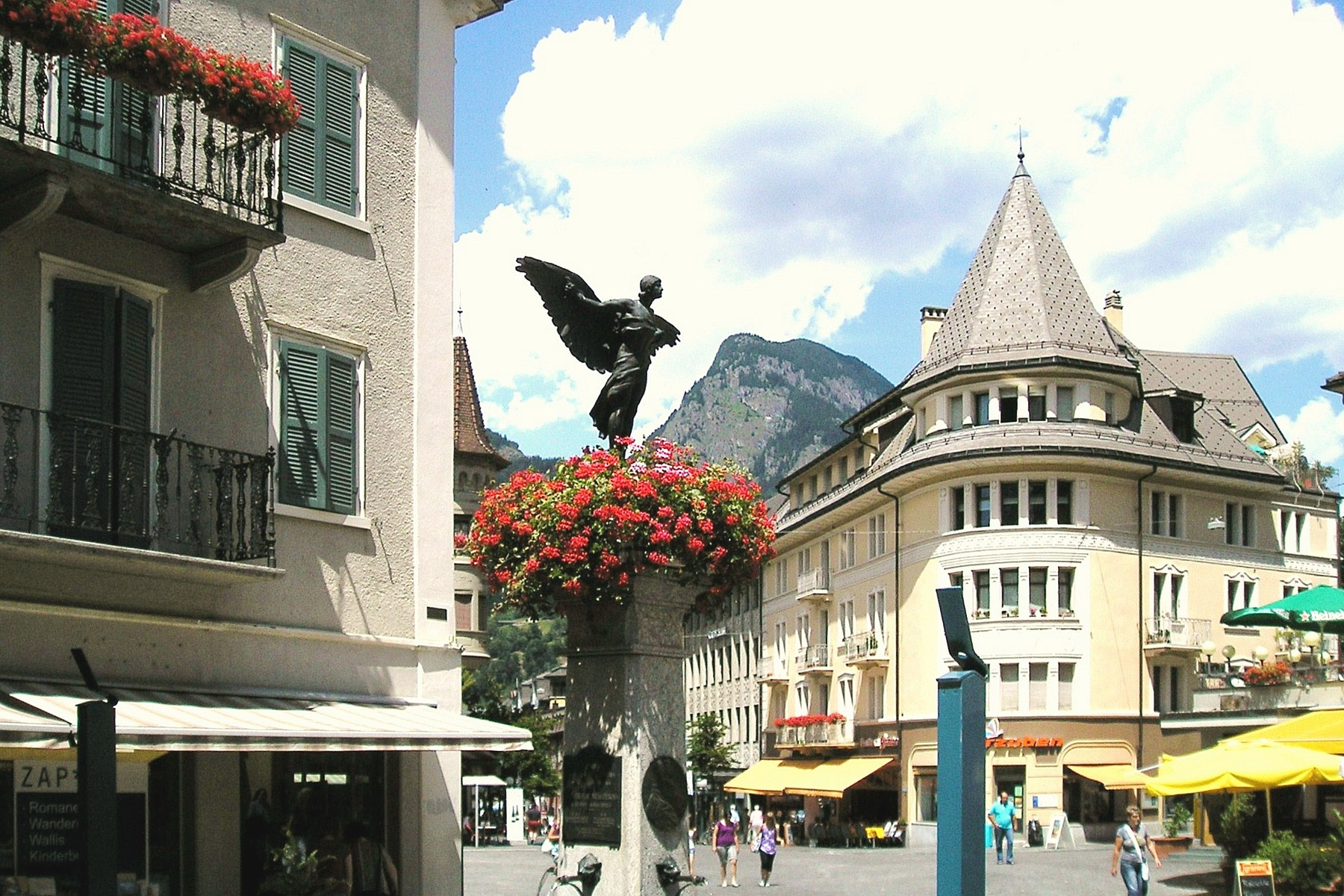
Town center

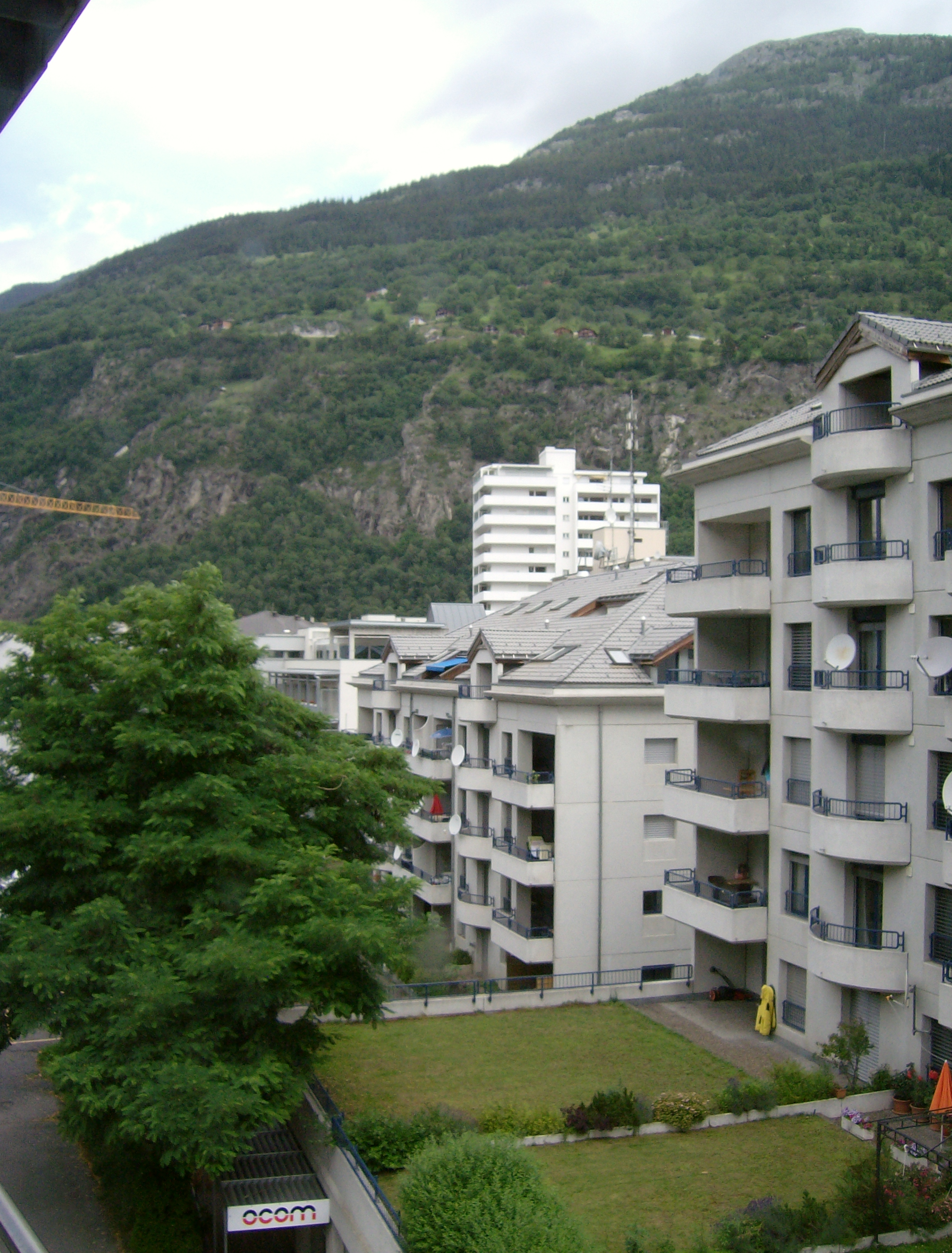
Modern apartment buildings in Brig

Brig-Glis has a population (as of December 2020) of 13,221. As of 2013, 15.5% of the population are resident foreign nationals. Over the last 3 years (2010–2013) the population has changed at a rate of 2.86%. The birth rate in the municipality, in 2013, was 8.9 while the death rate was 10.3 per thousand residents.

Most of the population (as of 2000) speaks German (10,465 or 90.3%) as their first language, Italian is the second most common (221 or 1.9%) and French is the third (197 or 1.7%). There are 8 people who speak Romansh. The language used in every day transactions is a unique German dialect, only used in this particular canton.

As of 2008, the gender distribution of the population was 47.9% male and 52.1% female. The population was made up of 5,049 Swiss men (41.2% of the population) and 826 (6.7%) non-Swiss men. There were 5,477 Swiss women (44.7%) and 902 (7.4%) non-Swiss women. Of the population in the municipality 4,456 or about 38.4% were born in Brig-Glis and lived there in 2000. There were 4,077 or 35.2% who were born in the same canton, while 1,154 or 10.0% were born somewhere else in Switzerland, and 1,479 or 12.8% were born outside of Switzerland. As of 2013, children and teenagers (0–19 years old) make up 17.5% of the population, while adults (20–64 years old) are 63.8% and seniors (over 64 years old) make up 18.7%.

As of 2000, there were 5,111 people who were single and never married in the municipality. There were 5,331 married individuals, 678 widows or widowers and 470 individuals who are divorced.

As of 2000, there were 4,494 private households in the municipality and an average of 2.4 persons per household. There were 1,361 households that consist of only one person and 288 households with five or more people. Out of a total of 4,634 households that answered this question, 29.4% were households made up of just one person and there were 63 adults who lived with their parents. Of the rest of the households, there are 1,233 married couples without children, 1,495 married couples with children. There were 263 single parents with a child or children. There were 79 households that were made up of unrelated people and 140 households that were made up of some sort of institution or another collective housing.

In 2000 there were 700 single family homes (or 44.6% of the total) out of a total of 1,571 inhabited buildings. There were 590 multi-family buildings (37.6%), along with 143 multi-purpose buildings that were mostly used for housing (9.1%) and 138 other use buildings (commercial or industrial) that also had some housing (8.8%).

In 2000, a total of 4,296 apartments (87.6% of the total) were permanently occupied, while 453 apartments (9.2%) were seasonally occupied and 154 apartments (3.1%) were empty. As of 2009, the construction rate of new housing units was 11.6 new units per 1000 residents. The vacancy rate for the municipality, in 2010, was 0.59%.

The historical population is given in the following chart:

== Heritage sites of national significance ==
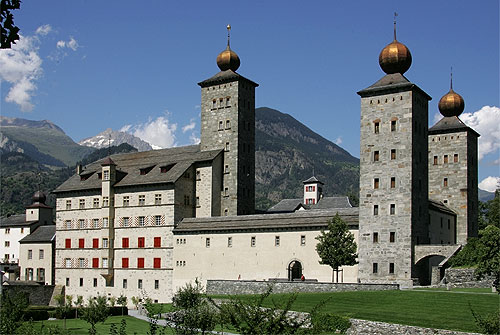
Stockalperpalast

The Stockalperpalast, the Gamsenmauer and the Church of Mariä Himmelfahrt with ossuary are listed as Swiss heritage site of national significance. The entire old town of Brig is part of the Inventory of Swiss Heritage Sites.

== Politics ==
In the 2015 federal election the most popular party was the CVP with 48.6% of the vote. The next three most popular parties were the SVP (32.7%), the SP (10.3%) and the FDP (4.3%). In the federal election, a total of 5,698 votes were cast, and the voter turnout was 62.1%. The 2015 election saw a large change in the voting when compared to 2011, with the percentage of the vote received by the SVP increasing from 25.9% in 2011 to 32.7% in 2015.

In the 2009 Conseil d'État/Staatsrat election a total of 4,340 votes were cast, of which 565 or about 13.0% were invalid. The voter participation was 50.1%, which is similar to the cantonal average of 54.67%. In the 2007 Swiss Council of States election a total of 4,825 votes were cast, of which 350 or about 7.3% were invalid. The voter participation was 56.2%, which is similar to the cantonal average of 59.88%.

In the 2007 federal election the most popular party was the CVP which received 55.37% of the vote. The next three most popular parties were the SVP (19.18%), the SP (14.86%) and the FDP (7.63%). In the federal election, a total of 4,878 votes were cast, and the voter turnout was 56.3%.

== Economy ==
As of 2010, Brig-Glis had an unemployment rate of 2.1%. As of 2008, there were 83 people employed in the primary economic sector and about 46 businesses involved in this sector. 1,297 people were employed in the secondary sector and there were 137 businesses in this sector. 6,755 people were employed in the tertiary sector, with 663 businesses in this sector. There were 5,400 residents of the municipality who were employed in some capacity, of which females made up 41.7% of the workforce.

In 2008 the total number of full-time equivalent jobs was 6,752. The number of jobs in the primary sector was 33, of which 23 were in agriculture, 8 were in forestry or lumber production and 2 were in fishing or fisheries. The number of jobs in the secondary sector was 1,242 of which 361 or (29.1%) were in manufacturing, 2 or (0.2%) were in mining and 798 (64.3%) were in construction. The number of jobs in the tertiary sector was 5,477. In the tertiary sector; 970 or 17.7% were in wholesale or retail sales or the repair of motor vehicles, 1,137 or 20.8% were in the movement and storage of goods, 436 or 8.0% were in a hotel or restaurant, 98 or 1.8% were in the information industry, 234 or 4.3% were the insurance or financial industry, 522 or 9.5% were technical professionals or scientists, 458 or 8.4% were in education and 1,042 or 19.0% were in health care.

In 2000, there were 4,531 workers who commuted into the municipality and 1,880 workers who commuted away. The municipality is a net importer of workers, with about 2.4 workers entering the municipality for every one leaving. About 8.7% of the workforce coming into Brig-Glis are coming from outside Switzerland. Of the working population, 17.7% used public transportation to get to work, and 40.5% used a private car.

== Transportation ==
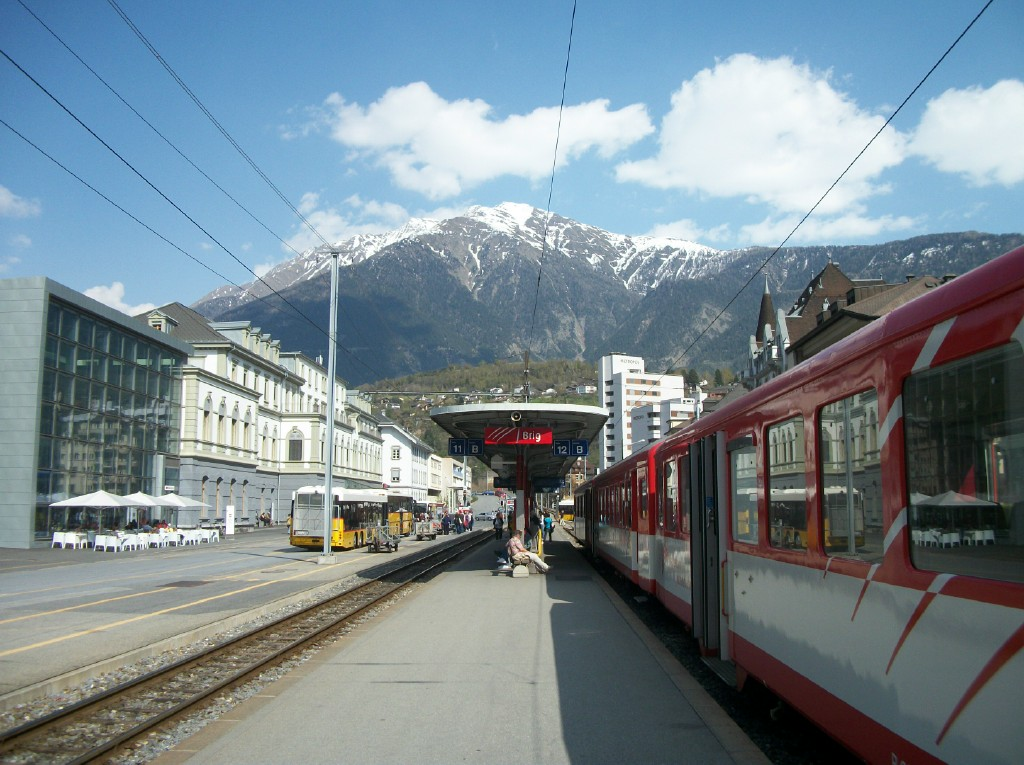
Small-gauge part of the Brig railway station, with Alpine peaks in the background.

Three standard gauge railway lines, namely the Simplon railway, the Milan–Domodossola railway, and the Bern-Lötschberg-Simplon railway, operated by either SBB CFF FFS or BLS AG, all meet at Brig railway station. Additionally, two metre gauge lines, both of them operated by Matterhorn Gotthard Bahn, and the metre gauge trains converging at Brig include the Glacier Express.

== Religion ==
From the 2000 census, 9,613 or 82.9% were Roman Catholic, while 634 or 5.5% belonged to the Swiss Reformed Church. Of the rest of the population, there were 173 members of an Orthodox church (or about 1.49% of the population), and there were 224 individuals (or about 1.93% of the population) who belonged to another Christian church. There were 322 (or about 2.78% of the population) who were Islamic. There were 20 individuals who were Buddhist, 22 individuals who were Hindu and 5 individuals who belonged to another church. 281 (or about 2.42% of the population) belonged to no church, are agnostic or atheist, and 406 individuals (or about 3.50% of the population) did not answer the question.

== Education ==
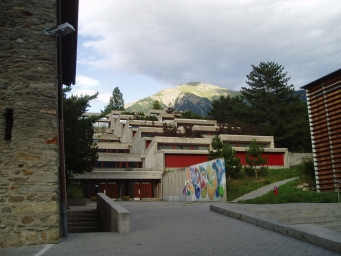
Cantonal school in Brig (HSK Brig)

In Brig-Glis about 4,245 or (36.6%) of the population have completed non-mandatory upper secondary education, and 1,344 or (11.6%) have completed additional higher education (either university or a Fachhochschule). Of the 1,344 who completed tertiary schooling, 61.8% were Swiss men, 21.4% were Swiss women, 10.2% were non-Swiss men and 6.6% were non-Swiss women.

During the 2010–2011 school year there were a total of 1,243 students in the Brig-Glis school system. The education system in the Canton of Valais allows young children to attend one year of non-obligatory Kindergarten. During that school year, there 9 kindergarten classes (KG1 or KG2) and 192 kindergarten students. The canton's school system requires students to attend six years of primary school. In Brig-Glis there were a total of 41 classes and 802 students in the primary school.

The secondary school program consists of three lower, obligatory years of schooling (orientation classes), followed by three to five years of optional, advanced schools. There were 441 lower secondary students who attended school in Brig-Glis. There were 1,451 upper secondary students in the municipality and 3 schools in the municipality The first school, the Spiritus Sanctus has 941 students and 43 classes. The second school, the HSK Brig (with KSS) has 102 students and 9 classes. The final school, the HMS-FMS-SfB (Trade school-vocational school-school for vocational preparation) has 408 students and 19 classes.

As of 2000, there were 1,177 students in Brig-Glis who came from another municipality, while 306 residents attended schools outside the municipality.

In terms of higher education, Brig is home to César Ritz Colleges Switzerland, a hospitality school named for the father of modern hospitality who was from the nearby town of Niederwald.

Brig-Glis is home to the Mediathek Wallis – Brig library. The library has (as of 2008) 95,906 books or other media and loaned out 195,233 items in the same year. It was open a total of 260 days with an average of 53 hours per week during that year.

== Weather ==
Brig is popular among winter sports athletes since it is surrounded by many Alp summits. The town itself lies close to the Rhône. Due to the high altitude, the temperatures in winter often remain below zero, resulting in frost. During the summer season, heat can be intense.

== Crime ==
In 2014 the crime rate, of the over 200 crimes listed in the Swiss Criminal Code (running from murder, robbery and assault to accepting bribes and election fraud), in Brig-Glis was 48.8 per thousand residents, slightly lower than the national average (64.6 per thousand). During the same period, the rate of drug crimes was 17.2 per thousand residents. This rate is 73.7% greater than the national rate. The rate of violations of immigration, visa and work permit laws was 10.3 per thousand residents, which is over twice as high as the national rate (4.9 per thousand).

== Notable people ==
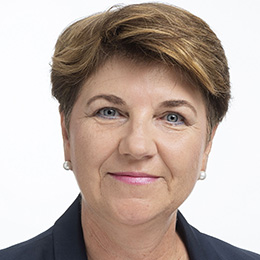
Viola Amherd, 2018

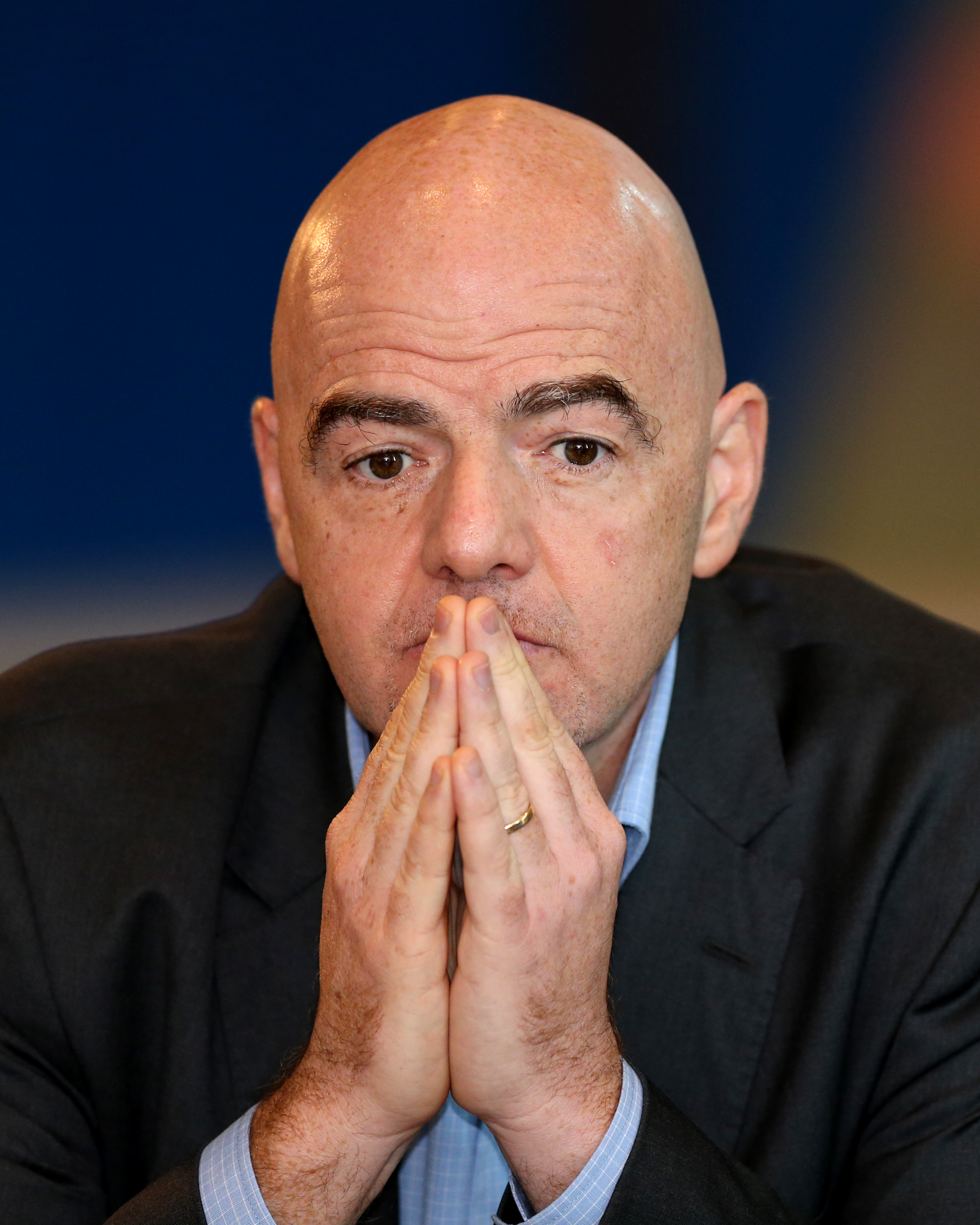
Gianni Infantino, 2017

- Ernest Guglielminetti (1862–1943), a medical doctor, lived and worked in Java, Sumatra, Borneo and Monaco.
- Willi Dreesen (1928–2013), painter and sculptor, lived in Brig from 1967
- Peter Stephan Zurbriggen (1943–2022), archbishop of the Catholic Church and papal diplomat
- Viola Amherd (born 1962), politician, elected to the Federal Council of Switzerland 2018
- Romed Wyder (born 1967), filmmaker, established in Geneva since 1989
- Gianni Infantino (born 1970), a Swiss–Italian football administrator, president of FIFA
- Manfred Elsig (born 1970), Professor of International Relations at the World Trade Institute of the University of Bern
- Rachel Harnisch (born 1973), operatic soprano.

=== Sport ===
- Charly In-Albon (born 1957), a retired footballer, over 300 club caps and 40 for Switzerland
- Lucia Näfen-Zehnder (born 1962), ski mountaineer, runner and politician; lives in Brig
- Silvan Zurbriggen (born 1981), a retired Swiss World Cup alpine ski racer
- Jeanine Cicognini (born 1986), a badminton player who now represents Italy
- Benjamin Weger (born 1989), biathlete, three-times olympian
- Nico Hischier (born 1999), ice hockey forward

== See also ==
- Brigue (Switzerland)
