= Coquihalla =

Coquihalla may refer to:

- Coquihalla River, British Columbia, Canada
  - Coquihalla Canyon Provincial Park
  - Coquihalla River Provincial Park
- Coquihalla Summit, British Columbia, Canada
- Okanagan—Coquihalla, a former federal electoral district in British Columbia

== See also ==
- British Columbia Highway 5, also known as Coquihalla highway, Canada
