= Coq d'Or =

Coq d'Or may refer to:

- Le Coq d'Or, opera by Rimsky-Korsakov
- Le Coq d'Or, a mime ballet based on extracts from the opera by Diaghilev

== Restaurants ==
- Coq d'Or, Mayfair London, now Langan's Brasserie
- Coq d'Or (Rotterdam restaurant), defunct Michelin starred restaurant,
- le Coq D'Or Restaurant, Sydney, location of Elaine Haxton mural 1944 Sir John Sulman Prize

== Other ==
- Coq d'Or (prize), songwriting prize won by André Pascal and others
- Coq d'Or (horse), beat Gay Crusader in 1917
