= Ernest Guglielminetti =

Swiss physician (1862–1943)

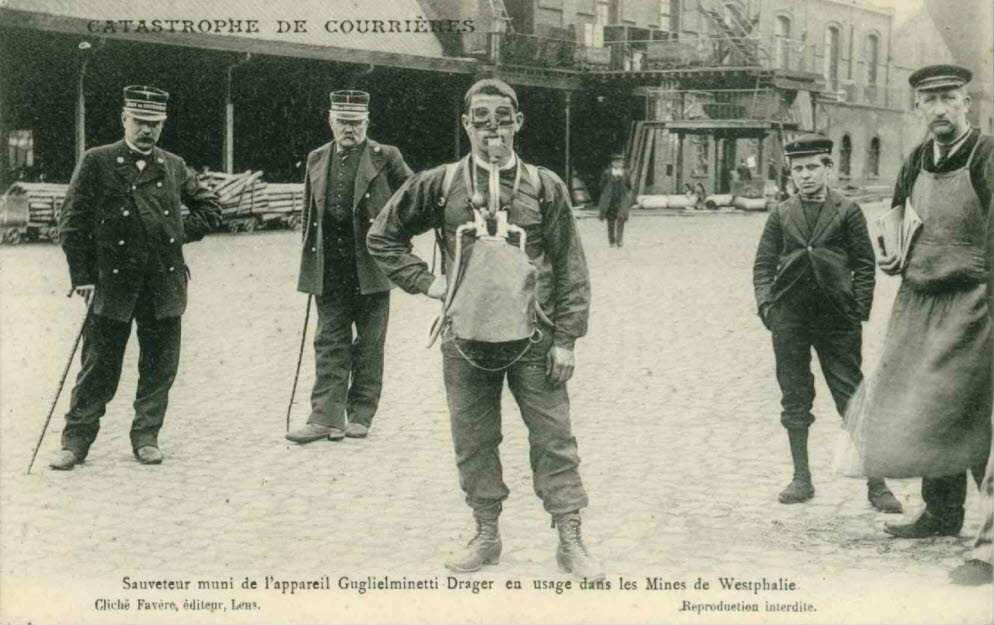
Courrières mine disaster - Rescuer equipped with Guglielminetti-Drager breathing apparatus

Ernest Guglielminetti (born 23 November 1862, Brig-Glis; died 20 February 1943, Geneva) was a Swiss medical doctor.

== Biography ==
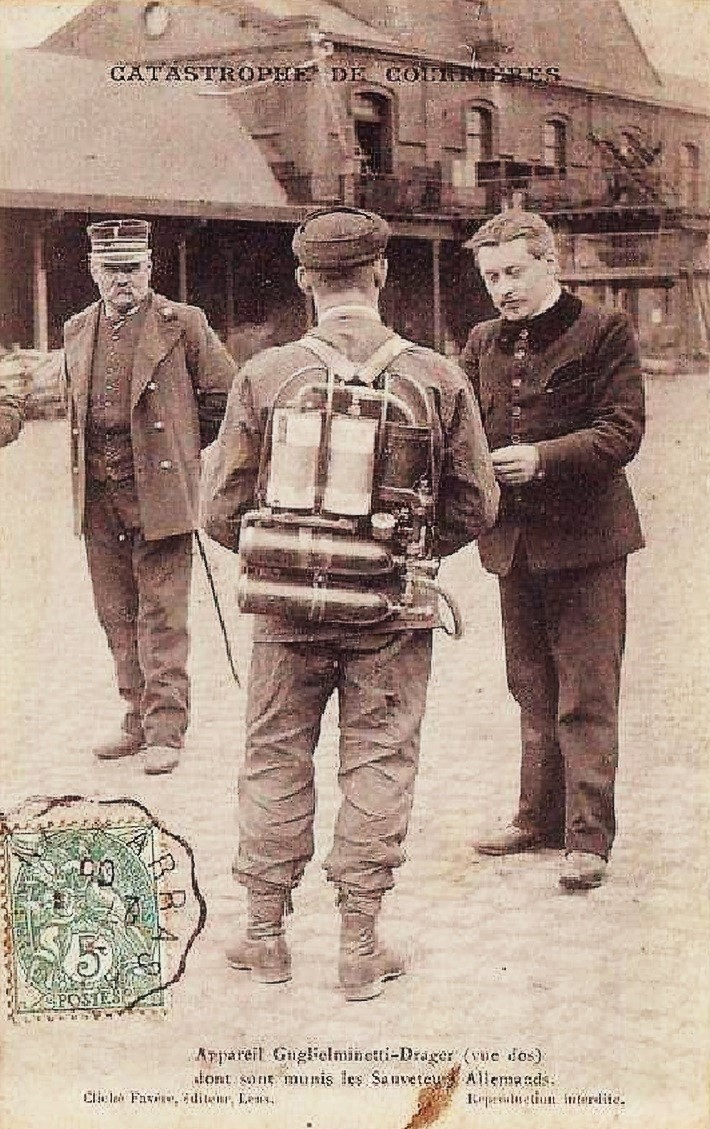
Courrières mine disaster - Rescuer equipped with Guglielminetti-Drager breathing apparatus

He studied medicine in Switzerland and received his doctorate in Bern on 1886. Then he travelled around the world and went as a military doctor to the Dutch Indies (Java, Sumatra) and later to the British North Borneo tobacco plantations.

In 1891 he developed a self-contained breathing apparatus for mountaineers, firefighters and frogmen.

In 1894, he settled in Monaco where he met Prince Albert I, who asked him what could be done to ban the dust stirred up by the first motor vehicles. He applied an idea found in Indonesian hospitals where wooden floors were coated with tar: he developed a new mixture of tar, gravel and sand for binding the dust.

On 13 March 1902, in Monaco, the tar street was invented and Dr E. Guglielminetti was given the nickname "Dr Goudron" (Dr "Tar").

A monument next to the Saltina bridge in Brig commemorates Ernest Guglielminetti.
