= Lecoq =

Lecoq is a surname. Notable people with the surname include:

- Karl Ludwig von Lecoq (1754–1829) of French Huguenot ancestry, first joined the army of the Electorate of Saxony, later transferred his loyalty to the Kingdom of Prussia and fought Napoleonic Wars
- Karl Christian Erdmann von Lecoq (1767–1830), a Saxon officer who rose to rank lieutenant-general during the Napoleonic Wars and was the commanding officer of the Royal Saxon army
- Henri Lecoq (1802–1871), a French botanist
- Paul Emile Lecoq de Boisbaudran (1838–1912), a French chemist, discoverer of the chemical elements gallium, samarium and dysprosium
- Maurice Lecoq (1854–1925), a French sport shooter who competed in the late 19th and early 20th centuries
- Jacques Lecoq (1921–1999), a French actor, mime and acting instruction
- Jacqueline Lecoq (born 1932), French designer who collaborated for many years with Antoine Philippon
- Paul Lecoq, Swiss senior physicist at CERN
- Titiou Lecoq (born 1980), French writer and feminist

== See also ==
- Monsieur Lecoq, a fictional character, the creation of Émile Gaboriau, a 19th-century French writer and journalist
