= Tochuhorn =

Mountain in Switzerland

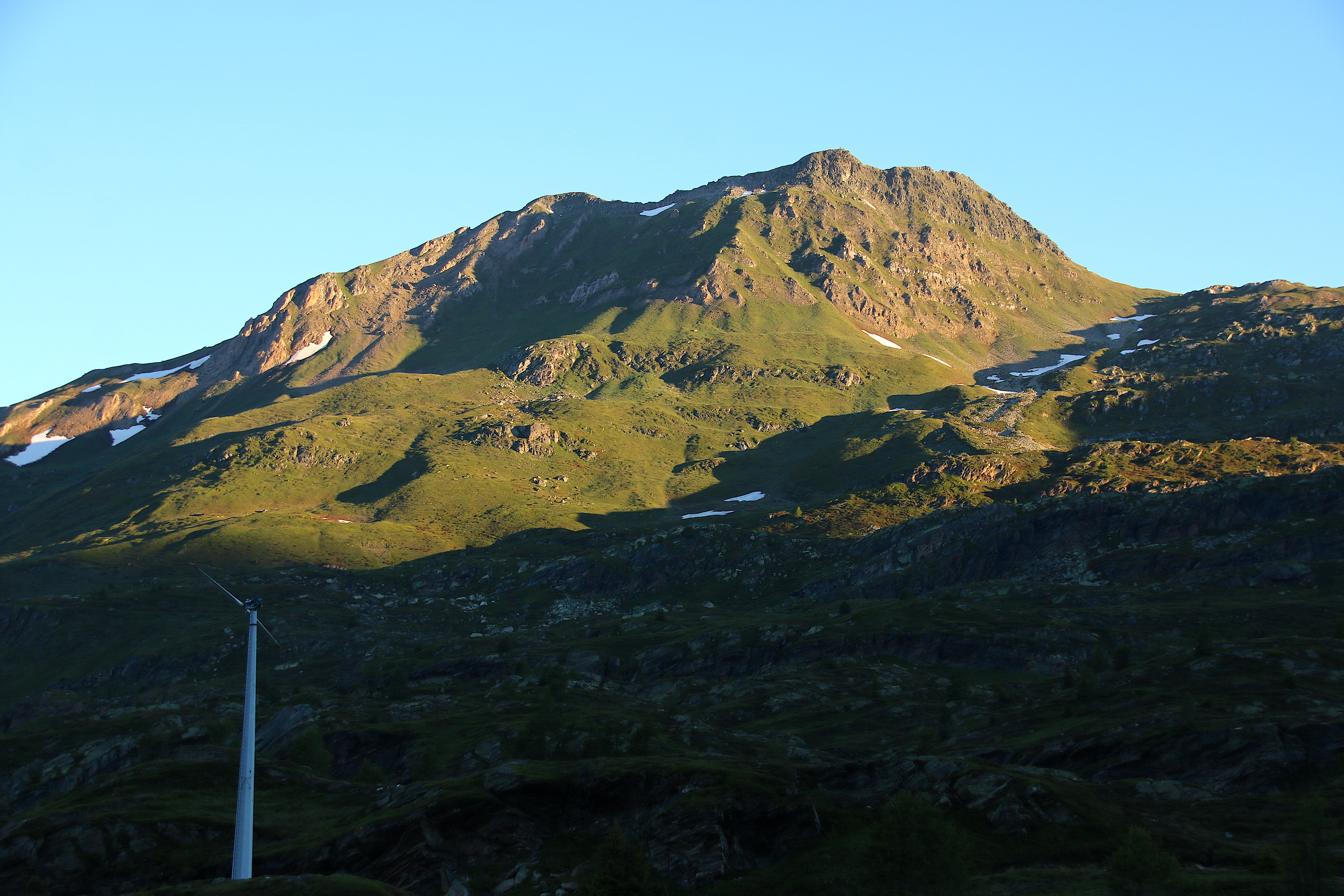
- Tochuhorn seen from Simplonpass

Highest point
- Elevation: 2,661 m (8,730 ft)
- Prominence: 187 m (614 ft)
- Parent peak: Spitzhorli
- Coordinates: 46°15′22.7″N 08°00′3.1″E

Geography
- Location within Switzerland
- Location: Valais, Switzerland
- Parent range: Pennine Alps

The Tochuhorn (2,661 m) is a mountain of the Swiss Pennine Alps, overlooking the Simplon Pass in the canton of Valais.
