= Karl Christian Erdmann von Le Coq =

Karl Christian Erdmann Ritter und Edler von Le Coq
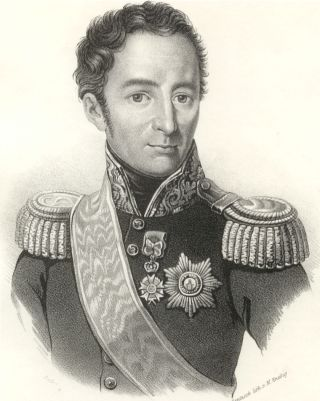
- Portrait of Charles wearing awarded decorations.
- Born: 28 October 1767; Torgau, Electorate of Saxony
- Died: 30 June 1830 (aged 62); Brig-Glis, Switzerland
- Military career
- Allegiance: Kingdom of Saxony
- Branch: Royal Saxon Army
- Service years: 1780–1815
- Rank: Lieutenant-General
- Commands: Royal Saxon Army; Saxon Corps
- Conflicts: Napoleonic Wars; French invasion of Russia; War of the Sixth Coalition; German campaign; Battle of Großbeeren; Battle of Dennewitz
- Awards: Military Order of St. Henry; Legion of Honour

Charles Christian Erdmann Ritter and Edler von Le Coq (Torgau, 28 October 1767 – Brig, 30 June 1830) was a Saxon officer who rose to the rank of Lieutenant-General and was the commanding officer of the Royal Saxon Army.

== Biography ==
Charles was the youngest son of the Saxon Lieutenant-General Jean Louis Le Coq (1719–1789) and brother of General Karl Ludwig von Le Coq (1754–1829).

When Le Coq was 13 years old he joined the Saxon infantry. On 30 May 1800 he was appointed a major. In the campaigns of 1806, 1807 and 1809, he fought with distinction; and on 22 February 1810 was promoted to lieutenant-general. In 1812 he received the command of the Saxon Corps marching to Russia. In 1813 he was entrusted with the command of the newly formed Saxon detachments, with whom he fought at the battles of Grossbeeren and Jüterbogk. In 1814 he commanded the Saxon occupation force in the Netherlands. Without his zeal for the return of the captive King Frederick Augustus I of Saxony it is likely that he would have been restored to his throne. With the division of Saxony he was responsible for dividing the army which he accomplished with skill and prudence. After the reconstituted peace of 1815, Le Coq was appointed to the new formation, and made a tremendous contribution to the high command of the army. He died on 30 June 1830 at Brig in the Swiss canton of Valais, on a trip to southern Italy.
