= Coquihalla River Provincial Park =

Provincial park in British Columbia, Canada

- IUCN category II (national park)
- Location within British Columbia Location within Fraser Valley Regional District
- Interactive map of Coquihalla River Provincial Park
- Location: Fraser Valley RD, British Columbia, Canada
- Nearest city: Hope
- Coordinates: 49°27′40″N 121°15′40″W
- Area: 103 ha (250 acres)
- Established: May 15, 1986
- Governing body: BC Parks

Coquihalla River Provincial Park is a provincial park in British Columbia, Canada, located 25 km (16 mi) north of the town of Hope on BC Highway 5 adjacent to the Coquihalla River.

The park was established as the Coquihalla River Recreation Area in 1986, comprising approximately 100 hectares (250 acres). It was upgraded in full provincial park status in 1999 but not fully upgraded by statute until 2000. Its area is now approximately 103 hectares (250 acres).
