= Coq d'Or (restaurant) =

Coordinates: 51°54′34.57″N 4°28′41.37″E

- Interactive map of Coq d'Or

Restaurant information
- Rating: Michelin Guide
- Location: Rotterdam, Netherlands

Coq d'Or (French for Golden Chicken) is a defunct restaurant in Rotterdam, Netherlands. It was a fine dining restaurant that was awarded one Michelin star in 1957 and retained that rating until 1989.

After a change of course, the restaurant lost its star in 1989. In 1995 the name of the restaurant was changed to "Restaurant Kip" (Dutch for Chicken).

== See also ==
- List of Michelin starred restaurants in the Netherlands
