= Spitzhorli =

Mountain in Switzerland

- Location within Switzerland

Highest point
- Elevation: 2,737 m (8,980 ft)
- Prominence: 320 m (1,050 ft)
- Coordinates: 46°15′51.4″N 7°58′50.2″E

Geography
- Location: Valais, Switzerland
- Parent range: Pennine Alps

The Spitzhorli is a mountain of the Swiss Pennine Alps, located between the Nanztal and the Gantertal, south of Brig-Glis in the canton of Valais.
