= Jean-Pierre Firmin Malher =

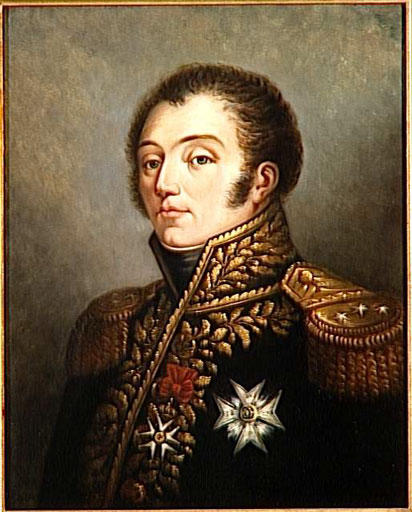
- Jean-Pierre Firmin Malher
- Born: 29 June 1761; Paris, France
- Died: 13 March 1808 (aged 46); Valladolid, Spain
- Military career
- Allegiance: France
- Rank: General of Division
- Conflicts: French Revolutionary Wars: Napoleonic Wars; • Battle of Günzburg

Jean-Pierre Firmin Malher (French pronunciation: [ʒɑ̃ pjɛʁ fiʁmɛ̃ malɛʁ]; 29 June 1761 – 13 March 1808) was a French general. He joined the army of the French First Republic and fought in the French Revolutionary Wars. During the Napoleonic Wars he rose in rank to command a division. He was accidentally killed in 1808 in the Peninsular War. His surname is one of the Names inscribed under the Arc de Triomphe.

== Early career ==
Born in Paris, Malher enlisted in the French army. During the War of the First Coalition, he became a colonel in 1794. He received promotion to general of brigade in 1799 and to general of division in August 1803. At the latter date, he commanded the 2nd subdivision of the 13th Military Division, headquartered in Rennes.

== Napoleonic Wars ==
=== 1805 ===
When Emperor Napoleon I of France's Grande Armée moved against Habsburg Austria during the War of the Third Coalition, Malher commanded the 3rd Division in Marshal Michel Ney's VI Corps. His 8,000-man division included six battalions of the 27th, 50th, and 59th Line Infantry Regiments and three battalions of the 27th Light Infantry Regiment, plus six cannons. His subordinates were Generals of Brigade Mathieu Delabassé and Pierre-Louis Binet de Marcognet.

On 8 October, the VI Corps marched to Giengen, northwest of Ulm. The following day, Ney ordered Malher to move south and seize the bridges over the Danube near Günzburg. To accomplish this task, Malher formed three columns. The western column under Etienne Nicolas Lefol aimed for the bridge at Leipheim. This force gave up after following a road that ended in a marsh. The 59th Regiment formed the eastern column, which was directed toward a bridge on the east side of Günzburg. The central column, which contained most of three regiments, marched straight at Günzburg. These troops collided with a force of Tyrolean jagers under Konstantin Ghilian Karl d'Aspré to start the Battle of Günzburg.

Alarmed by the French, the defenders of Günzburg destroyed all the bridges. Cut off, d'Aspré surrendered with 200 jagers and two cannons. Malher tried to rebuild the two bridges at Günzburg but was forced to give up under the intense fire of 20 cannons and the Archduke Charles Infantry Regiment # 3. Later that day, the Austrian commander Karl Mack von Lieberich ordered the bridge on the eastern outskirts of the town to be reconstructed by Ignaz Gyulai. As soon as Gyulai's men rebuilt the span, the 59th belatedly appeared and rushed the bridge. Though outnumbered three-to-one, the attack led by Delabassé crashed through Gyulai's defenses and captured the span. The 59th deployed in square formation to repel the Austrian cavalry charges that followed. Malher moved the rest of his division to support the success and the French troops held the bridge against Austrian counterattacks. Mack retreated to Ulm on 10 October, conceding victory to the French.

On 13 October, Malher clashed with an Austrian force led by Johann Laudon at the Elchingen bridge. The next day, he led his troops at the Battle of Elchingen, but his division was only lightly engaged. After the successful conclusion of the Ulm Campaign, Napoleon sent the divisions of Malher and Louis Henri Loison of Ney's corps to the County of Tyrol. On 4 November, the Austrians defeated Ney's attacks at Scharnitz with heavy losses. However, on the same day the French wiped out a second Austrian force at Leutasch. Ney went on to capture Innsbruck the following day.

=== 1808 ===
On 30 November 1807, a French army occupied Lisbon in the Kingdom of Portugal. It had been allowed to cross the Kingdom of Spain by agreement and Spanish forces occupied parts of Portugal. But Napoleon also plotted to add Spain to his empire by replacing the unpopular regime of King Charles IV of Spain. On the pretext of supporting the occupation force in Portugal, 75,000 French troops crossed into Spain in early 1808 and took over key strategic locations. On 13 March, Malher was accidentally killed during a military exercise in Valladolid.

The name MALHER is engraved on Column 7 of the Arc de Triomphe. An urn with Malher's heart resides in the Panthéon in Paris.
