= Lambert Nypels =

Belgian officer (1783–1851)

Lieutenant General Lambert Nypels
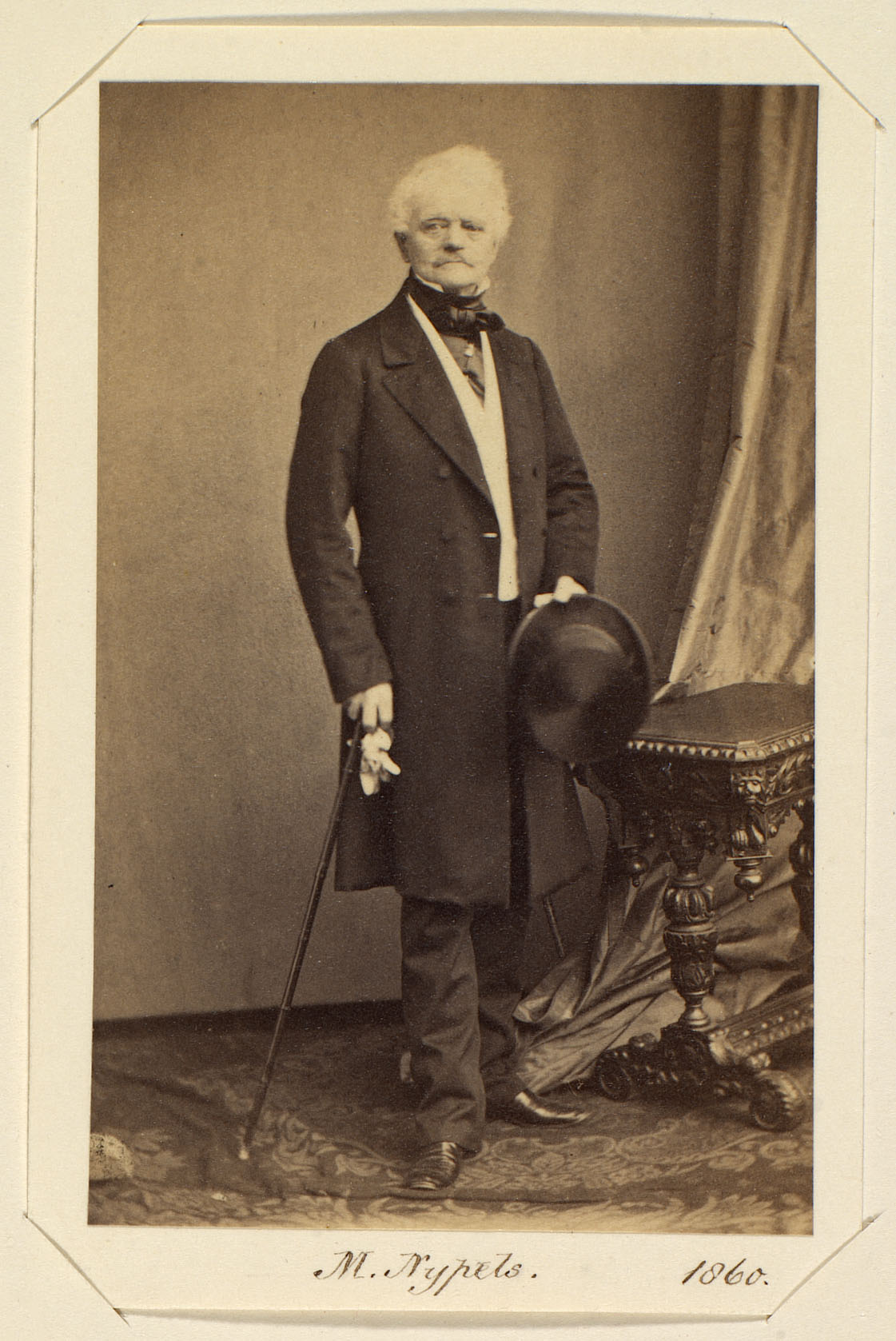
- Born: 24 June 1783; Maastricht, Dutch Republic
- Died: 22 August 1851 (aged 68); Brussels, Belgium
- Burial place: Saint-Josse-ten-Noode
- Military career
- Allegiance: Belgium
- Branch: Grande Armee (until 1815), Dutch Armed Forces (1815 – 1830), Belgian Armed Forces (from 1830)
- Service years: 1801 – 1815 (France) 1815 – 1830 (Netherlands) 1830 – 1842 (Belgium)
- Battles/wars: Napoleonic Wars: Battle of Wertingen; Battle of Günzburg; Battle of Elchingen; Battle of Austerlitz; Battle of Jena-Auerstedt; Battle of Eylau; Battle of Friedland; Battle of Raab; Battle of Wagram; Peninsular War; French invasion of Russia; Battle of Maloyaroslavets; German campaign of 1813; Campaign in north-east France (1814); Battle of Brienne; Battle of La Rothière; Battle of Champaubert; Battle of Montereau; Ten days' campaign (disputed)

Lambert Nypels (24 June 1783 – 22 August 1851) was a Belgian military officer. He served in the Grande Armée and took part in numerous battles during the Napoleonic wars. At the end of the Empire, he joined the Dutch Armed Forces and, in 1830, when Belgium gained independence, he sided with Belgium. He then led the Belgian troops until his retirement in 1842.

== Biography ==
Lambert Pierre Antoine André Servais was born on 24 June 1783 in Maastricht. On 1 March 1801, at the age of 18, he enlisted as a sergeant in the service of the French First Republic, in the légion franche. He fought in Italy and was promoted to second lieutenant in May of the same year, but only remained a non-commissioned officer for three months.

In 1804, Napoleon planned to invade England, and Nypels was to take part in the assault. The project was ultimately abandoned, and he was sent to Germany. From 1805 to 1814, he participated in various military campaigns of the First French Empire. During this period, Lambert Nypels showed a "chivalrous" character in the face of the enemy.

He thus participated in 1805 in the battles of Wertingen, Günzburg, Elchingen, and Austerlitz.He was shot in the leg at the Battle of Jena in 1806 and was promoted to lieutenant for "brilliant conduct". In 1807, he fought at Eylau and Friedland. He was wounded in 1809 at Raab, where he was hailed as the "brave among the bravest".

He continued to fight and took part in the Battle of Wagram. There, he was hit by a cannonball, which "plowed" through both his thighs. He then returned to France and was promoted to captain on 17 November 1809. He did not hesitate to return to the battlefield, this time with the Army of Spain, participating in the entire Spanish campaign. He then rejoined the Grande Armée and was gravely wounded at the Battle of Maloyaroslavets and witnessed the French invasion of Russia.

In 1813, he was once again wounded, this time by a shell fragment, in Mantua, Italy. The same year, he was promoted to battalion commander and took part in the Saxon campaign. The following year, during the 1814 campaign in France, he fought at the battles of Brienne, La Rothière, Champaubert, and Montereau.

On 14 March 1815, at his request, he resigned from the French army and on April 4, joined the newly formed Netherlands Armed Forces with the rank of lieutenant-commander. He commanded the 21st militia battalion, then the following year the infantry division depot, and in 1826, he took command, with the rank of colonel, of the 3rd infantry division.

In 1830, Belgium was formed, and the provisional government called on officers in the Netherlands. Nypels, despite his advantageous position in the Dutch army, joined Belgium. He was promoted to major general, and on 3 October 1830 he took command of the mobile forces. His role was to turn the volunteers into a real armed force. At the end of the year, he was promoted to lieutenant general.

In 1831, while commanding the 2nd division, the Netherlands attempted to regain control of Belgium. Although it was unsuccessful, Nypels was, according to some, involved in this counter-revolution. He then decided that his conduct should be examined by the high military court and voluntarily became a prisoner. A non-lieu ruling closed the case. On 20 November 1832 he joined the headquarters of Leopold I.

In 1835, he ran for election and was selected for the Ruremonde district but was not elected due to nationality issues. Two years later, on 14 December 1837, he was appointed president of the Military Pensions Commission, a position he held until 19 August 1838. While he retired from the military on 18 July 1842, he was appointed by the government as the senior commander of the Brussels Civic Guards, holding this position until 1849. He died in Brussels on 22 August 1851, and was buried in the cemetery of Saint-Josse-ten-Noode.

== Titles and Honors ==
- Legion of Honour Cross (1809)
- Knight of the Legion of Honour (1813).
- Officer of the Legion of Honour (1814).
- Knight of the Order of Leopold (1833)
- Officer of the Order of Leopold (1837)

== See also ==
Media related to Lambert Nypels at Wikimedia Commons

=== Bibliography ===
- Royal Academy of Science, Letters and Fine Arts of Belgium (1901). Biographie nationale de Belgique (PDF) (in French). Vol. 16. Brussels: Bruylant Editions.
- Laroière, Louis de (1880). Military Pantheon or Memorial of Belgian Generals, Inspector Generals of the Health Service & Chief Intendants, who died since 1830 (in French). De Laroière.
