= Nypels =

Nypels is a surname. Notable people with the surname include:

- Erwin Nypels (1933–2024), Dutch politician
- Lambert Nypels (1783–1851), Belgian officer
