= Battle of Elchingen =

1805 battle during the War of the Third Coalition

- Part of the Ulm campaign within the War of the Third Coalition
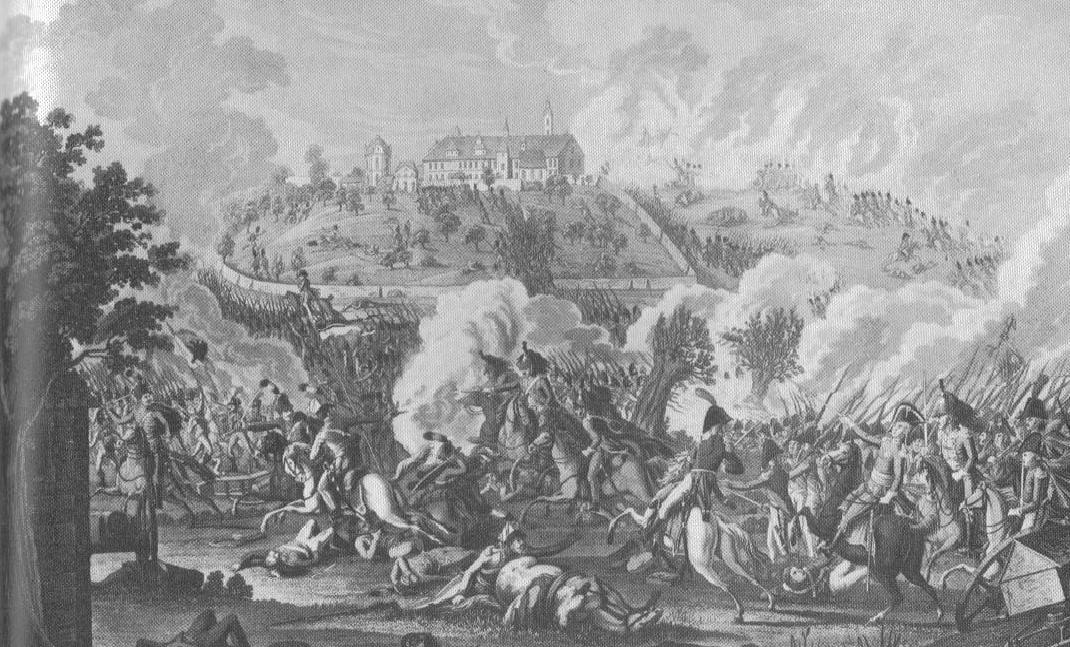
- Battle of Elchingen from an engraving by Johann Lorenz Rugendas. French infantry storm the abbey while dragoons chase fleeing Austrians.
Date	14 October 1805
Location	Elchingen, Bavaria, present-day Germany 48°27′15″N 10°5′26″E
Result	French victory

Belligerents
(First French Empire) French Empire	Austrian Empire

Commanders and leaders
(First French Empire) Michel Ney	(Holy Roman Empire) Johann von Riesch

Units involved
VI Corps (Grande Armée)	Riesch's Corps

Strength
17,000	16,000

Casualties and losses
793–854	6,000
- Location within Bavaria Battle of Elchingen (Germany)

War of the Third Coalition:
Ulm Campaign
current battle
Napoleon in command
Napoleon not in command

The Battle of Elchingen, fought on 14 October 1805, saw French forces under Michel Ney rout an Austrian corps led by Johann Sigismund Riesch. This defeat led to a large part of the Austrian army being invested in the fortress of Ulm by the army of Emperor Napoleon Bonaparte of France while other formations fled to the east. Soon afterward, the Austrians trapped in Ulm surrendered and the French mopped up most of the remaining Austrian forces, bringing the Ulm Campaign to a close.

In late September and early October 1805, Napoleon carried out a gigantic envelopment of the Austrian army in Bavaria led by Karl Mack von Lieberich. While the Austrian army lay near Ulm, south of the Danube River, the French army marched west on the north side of the river. Then Napoleon's troops crossed the river east of Ulm, cutting the Austrian retreat route to Vienna. Finally waking up to his danger, Mack tried to break out on the north side of the river, but a lone French division blocked his first attempt.

Realizing that his enemies might escape the trap, Napoleon ordered Ney to cross to the north bank of the river. Ney's larger corps attacked Riesch's corps at Elchingen on the north bank. The French captured the heights and drove the Austrian soldiers west toward Ulm, forcing many of them to surrender. While a body of Austrians remained at large on the north bank, the near destruction of Riesch's command meant that the bulk of Mack's army was hopelessly surrounded in Ulm.

== Background ==
On 8 September, the army of Feldmarschall-Leutnant Karl Mack and Feldmarschall-Leutnant Archduke Ferdinand of Austria-Este crossed the Inn River and invaded the Electorate of Bavaria. Mack planned to establish 88 battalions and 148 squadrons on the Lech River near Augsburg by the end of October. Though called upon to join Austria against France, Elector Maximilian IV Joseph of Bavaria instead withdrew his army north to the Main River in accordance with his secret alliance with France.

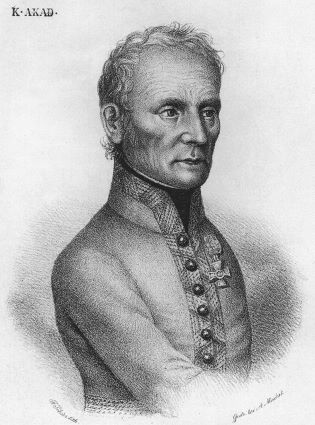
Karl Mack von Leiberich changed the strategic plan

By 12 September when the Austrians occupied Munich, Mack changed his mind and discarded his earlier plan. He decided to concentrate his army farther west on the Iller River so he could counterattack any French invasion coming through the Black Forest. As part of his new strategy, Feldmarschall-Leutnant Franjo Jelačić (also Franz Jellacic) was ordered to move from Feldmarschall-Leutnant Archduke John's Army of the Tyrol to Lake Constance. Mack expected to have 50,000 to 55,000 troops in position near Ulm by the end of September. Jellačić would hold the left flank with 11,000 soldiers while Feldmarschall-Leutnant Michael von Kienmayer 12,000-man corps watched the Bavarians from Ingolstadt. However, the change of plans threw the Austrian army's supply system into disarray. As the weather turned bad, sickness and desertion began to diminish the army's numbers. The nominal army commander, Archduke Ferdinand and Mack's chief of staff General-Major Anton Mayer von Heldensfeld both insisted that the army halt at the Lech as originally planned. By the end of September, relations between Mack and Ferdinand became so poor that all communication between the two was done in writing.

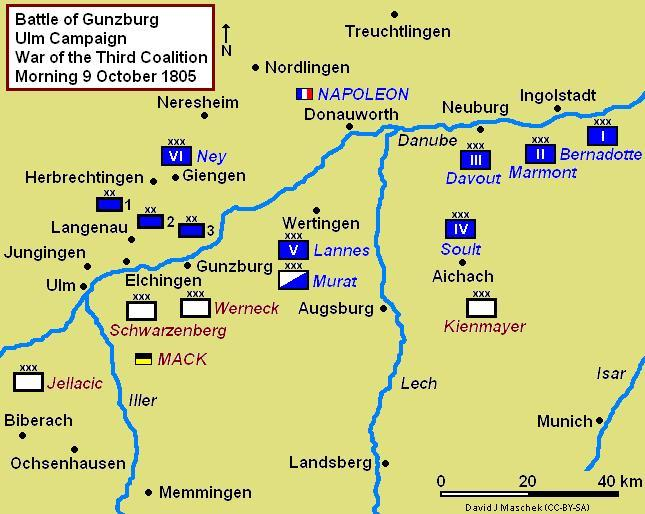
Battle of Gunzburg strategic map, situation morning 9 October 1805

Ferdinand and Mayer appealed to Emperor Francis II. The emperor sought the advice of Feldmarschall Archduke Charles, who commanded the Army of Italy, and was warned that Mack was making a strategic blunder. Even so, the emperor backed Mack to the hilt and relieved Mayer of his post. Mack's army began to assemble on the Iller. On 24 and 25 September, Napoleon launched the Grande Armée across the Rhine River to open the Ulm Campaign. While Marshal Joachim Murat's Cavalry Corps and Marshal Jean Lannes's V Corps advanced directly east toward Ulm, the bulk of Napoleon's army passed to the north of the Austrian army. Marshal Jean-Baptiste Bernadotte's I Corps, General of Division Auguste Marmont's II Corps, Marshal Louis Davout's III Corps, Marshal Nicolas Soult's IV Corps, and Marshal Ney's VI Corps wheeled east, then southeast, then south. On 5 October, Kienmayer reported that the French were in Ansbach, to the north of the Danube. Two days later, the French crossed the Danube on a broad front, moving south.

At this time Mack's army was divided into four corps. Jellačić had 15,000 troops in 16 infantry battalions, six Jäger companies, and six cavalry squadrons to the south of Ulm. Feldmarschall-Leutnant Karl Philipp, Prince of Schwarzenberg commanded 28 battalions and 30 squadrons at Ulm. Feldmarschall-Leutnant Franz von Werneck had 30 battalions and 24 squadrons near Günzburg. Kienmayer's command near Ingolstadt consisted of 19 battalions and 34 squadrons. Unwisely, Mack decided to defend Ulm, instead of trying to escape the approaching French army.

Mack reacted by sending Feldmarschall-Leutnant Franz Xaver von Auffenberg with only 6,000 men to stop the French. Murat and Lannes crushed the hapless Auffenberg at the Battle of Wertingen, inflicting losses of 400 killed and wounded on the Austrians and capturing 2,900 soldiers and six cannons. The next day, General of Division Jean-Pierre Firmin Malher's VI corps division attacked General-Major Konstantin Ghilian Karl d'Aspré's 7,000 troops in the Battle of Günzburg. The Austrians suffered 2,000 casualties while the French lost 700 soldiers.

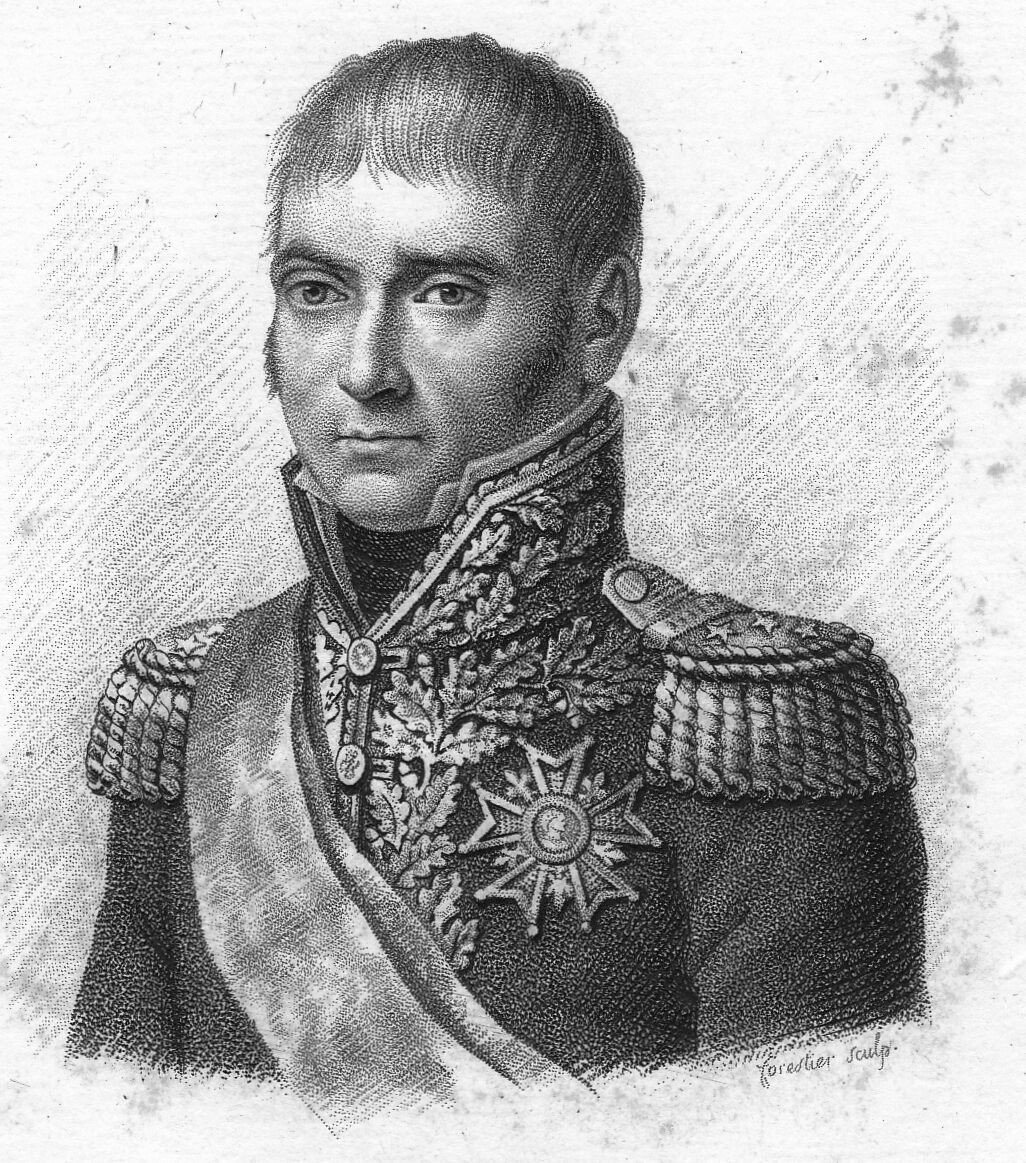
Pierre Dupont

Napoleon placed Davout and Bernadotte at Munich to guard against General Mikhail Kutuzov's Russian army and Kienmayer's troops. The emperor sent Soult west to Memmingen, south of Ulm. Murat, Lannes, Ney, Marmont, and the Imperial Guard moved directly west toward Ulm. At this time, Ney's corps was still on the north bank. On 11 October, when Murat ordered Ney to bring his corps to the south bank, Ney furiously protested but was overruled. In consequence, Mack and Prince Schwarzenberg with 25,000 troops fell upon General of Division Pierre Dupont's solitary division in the Battle of Haslach-Jungingen that day. Dupont's 5,350 infantry, supported by General of Division Jacques Louis François Delaistre de Tilly's 2,169 cavalry fought the Austrians to a standstill. Dupont's force was mauled, losing 1,400 casualties, plus 11 guns and 2 eagles captured. Austrian losses numbered 6,100 killed, wounded, and captured.

However, Mack was wounded in the fight and, with his force, "tamely returned to Ulm that night." On 12 October Mack reorganized his army into four corps under Schwarzenberg, Werneck, Jellačić, and Feldmarschall-Leutnant Riesch. The units were organized similar to the French corps, except that Mack constantly shuffled the component units. That day, Mack issued a flurry of orders, each set countermanding the previous instructions. In sum, he ordered Jellačić to march south to the Tyrol, Schwarzenberg to hold Ulm, and Werneck to move north to Heidenheim an der Brenz followed by General-Major Johann Ludwig Alexius von Loudon's division of Riesch's corps. This was followed by a council of war at which Mack decided to send Riesch along the Danube to destroy all the bridges. In one speculative account, the real reason Mack sent Jellačić to the Tyrol was to get rid of Mayer, who led a brigade. Historian Frederick Kagan surmised that Mack was either confused or he deliberately scattered his army to give it a better chance to escape. In any case, Mack soon issued a new set of orders which were similar to the last set. Riesch set out with his command on the 13th, marching on water-logged roads in the direction of Elchingen.

On 13 October several French corps marched west on the south side of the Danube. Napoleon still hoped to encircle Mack's forces south of the river. He seemed unaware of the possibility that the Austrians could get away on the north bank. That day, Napoleon heard from Ney that only Dupont's division and some cavalry occupied the north bank in force. The French emperor ordered Ney and Marshal Joachim Murat to shift their forces to the north side of the river the next day. Also on the 13th, Soult wiped out General-Major Karl Spangen von Uyternesse's brigade in the Battle of Memmingen, capturing 4,600 men at the cost of 16 casualties.

== Battle ==
=== Austrian forces ===
On 13 October when he arrived at Elchingen, Riesch found Loudon sparring with a French force for control of the bridge over the Danube. Feeling unable to defeat the French, he broke off the fight and merely posted troops to defend the north bank of the river and left the bridge intact with the French in control of the south end of the span. He passively ordered his troops to pitch camp at Elchingen. Kagan proposed that Riesch failed to act more aggressively because he had lost faith in Mack's ability.

Riesch and an 8,000-man Austrian corps occupied high ground near the villages of Ober- and Unter-Elchingen. Deployed on the heights under Loudon and General-Major Daniel Mécsery were 14 battalions of infantry, 11 squadrons of cavalry, and 12 artillery pieces. The infantry contingent included four battalions each of the Riese Infantry Regiment Nr. 15 and Erbach Infantry Regiment Nr. 42, two battalions of the Archduke Ludwig Infantry Regiment Nr. 8, and the 1st Battalion of the Kaiser Infantry Regiment Nr. 1. The cavalry consisted of six squadrons of the Rosenberg Chevau-léger Regiment Nr. 6, three squadrons of the Hohenzollern Cuirassier Regiment Nr. 8, and two squadrons of the Archduke Franz Cuirassier Regiment Nr. 2.

=== Alternate Austrian Order of Battle ===
An alternate order of battle is given by Scott Bowden in his highly detailed account of the battle. In this version Riesch has 32 battalions of infantry (13,300), 12 1/2 squadrons of cavalry (1,250) and 14 guns served by 450 crew, for nearly 15,000 men. Bowden's order of battle from the Osterreichschen Kriegsarchiv.

- Corps: FML Riesch
  - 1st Division: GM von Loudon
    - Avantgarde: GM Prinz Coburg
      - Erzherzog Ludwig IR #8 (three fusilier and one grenadier battalions, reduced strength from casualties at Haslach-Jungingen)
      - Hussar Regt Blankenstein #6 (two squadrons)
    - Center Brigade: GM Genedegh
      - Karl Riese IR #15 (four fusilier battalions, somewhat reduced from action at Haslach-Jungingen)
      - Erzherzog Maximilien IR #35 (four fusilier battalions)
      - Cuirassier Regt Hohenzollern #8 (two squadrons)
      - Uhlanen-Regt Schwarzenberg #2 (one squadron of approx 150 men)
    - Reserve Brigade: GM Ulm
      - Froon IR #54 (two fusilier battalions that had suffered greatly at Haslach-Jungingen)
      - Froon IR #54 (one grenadier battalion only lightly engaged at Haslach-Jungingen)
      - Josef Colloredo IR #57 (one grenadier battalion)
      - Cuirassier Regt Hohenzollern #8 (two squadrons)
    - Cavalry battery armed with four 6-pounder guns and two howitzers
  - 2nd Division: FML von Hessen-Homburg
    - Avantgarde: GM Mescery
      - Erbach IR #42 (three fusilier battalions and one grenadier battalion)
      - Cuirassier Regt Erzherzog Franz #2 (two squadrons)
    - Center Brigade: GM Auersperg
      - Erzherzog Karl IR #3 (four fusilier battalions)
      - Erzherzog Auersperg #24 (four fusilier battalions)
      - Cuirassier Regt Erzherzog Franz #2 (one-and-a-half squadrons)
    - Reserve Brigade: GM Hermann
      - Froon IR #54 (two additional fusilier battalions from this regiment that had not been at Haslach-Jungingen)
      - Erzherzog Karl IR #3 (the grenadier battalion from this regiment)
      - Auersperg IR #24 (the grenadier battalion from this regiment)
      - Cuirassier Regt Erzherzog Franz #2 (two squadrons)
    - Eight 6-pounder guns, distributed as battalion support to the Auersperg IR #24 and Froon IR #54

=== French forces ===
Opposing this array, Ney's VI Corps including the 2nd Division of Louis Henri Loison and the 3rd Division under Malher. The force included the Corps Cavalry Division led by Auguste François-Marie de Colbert-Chabanais, a reinforced dragoon brigade from Bourcier's 4th Dragoon Division, plus 28 cannons and howitzers.

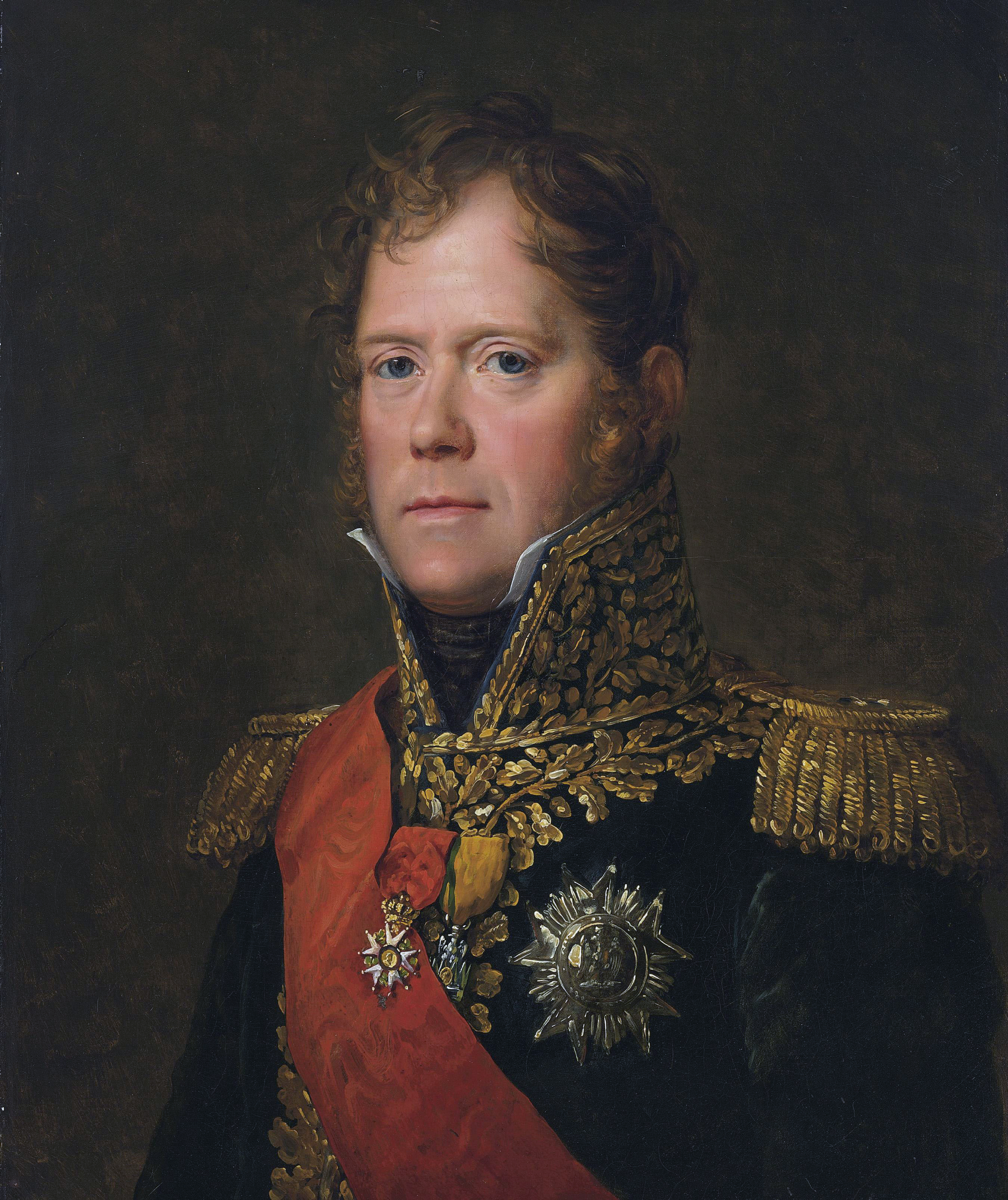
Marshal Michel Ney

VI Corps: Marshal Michel Ney

- 2nd Division: General of Division Louis Henri Loison
  - Brigade: General of Brigade Eugene-Casimir Villatte
    - 6th Light Infantry Regiment (two battalions, 1,728 men)
    - 39th Line Infantry Regiment (two battalions, 1,633 men)
  - Brigade: General of Brigade François Roguet
    - 69th Line Infantry Regiment (two battalion, 1,698 men)
    - 76th Line Infantry Regiment (three battalions, 1,789 men)
  - 2nd Division Artillery:
    - One foot company armed with three 8-pound cannons and one howitzer
    - One horse artillery section armed with one 4-pound cannon and one howitzer, total 89 men
- 3rd Division: General of Division Jean-Pierre Firmin Malher (Malher's division did not actively participate in the combat)
  - Brigade: General of Brigade Pierre-Louis Binet de Marcognet
    - 25th Light Infantry Regiment (three battalions, 1,540 men)
    - 27th Line Infantry Regiment (two battalions, 1,347 men)
  - Brigade: General of Brigade Mathieu Delabassée
    - 50th Line Infantry Regiment (two battalions, 1,547 men)
    - 59th Line Infantry Regiment (two battalions, 1,621 men)
  - 3rd Division Artillery:
    - One foot company armed with one 12-pound, four 8-pound and one 4-pound cannons, 65 men
- VI Corps units:
  - Cavalry Brigade: General of Brigade Auguste François-Marie de Colbert-Chabanais
    - 3rd Hussar Regiment (three squadrons, 150 men)
    - 10th Chasseurs à Cheval Regiment (three squadrons, 140 men)
  - Artillery Reserve: Colonel Jean Nicolas Seroux
    - 1st Regt of Foot Artillery (two companies armed with four 12-pound, five 8-pound, and two 4-pound cannons and one howitzer, 331 men)
    - 2nd Regt of Horse Artillery (two sections of the 1st company armed with two 8-pound cannons and two howitzers, 65 men)
- 4th Dragoon Division: (attached from Reserve Cavalry Corps)
  - Brigade: General of Brigade Jacques Laplanche
    - 18th Dragoon Regiment (three squadrons, 305 men)
    - 19th Dragoon Regiment (three squadrons, 290 men)
    - 25th Dragoon Regiment (three squadrons, 240 men)

Total French engaged at Elchingen (not including Malher's division): 6,848 infantry, 1,125 cavalry, 485 artillerymen, 28 guns

=== French attack ===
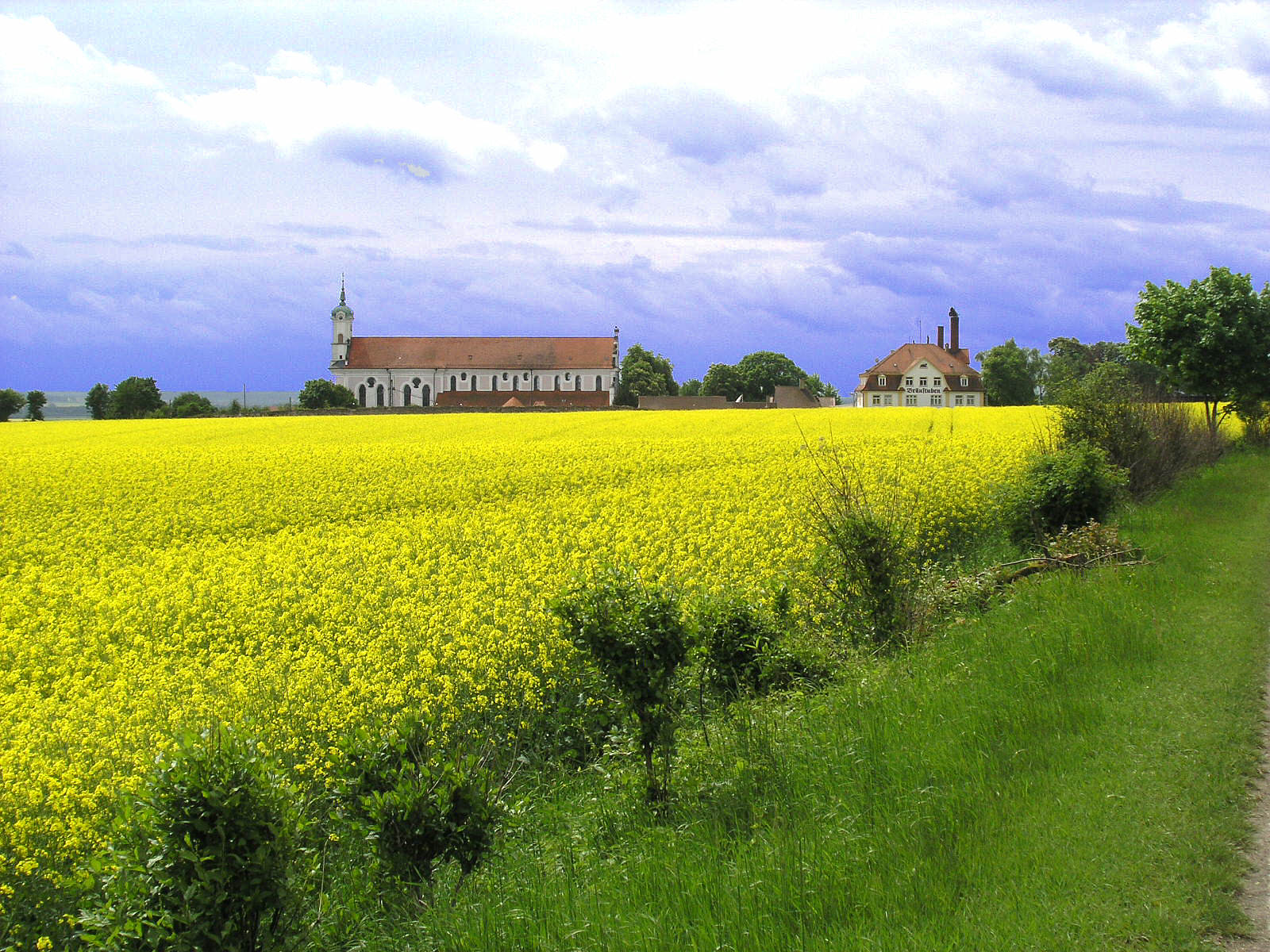
The battlefield in front of the monastery of Elchingen

Dupont was already north of the Danube with Tilly's horsemen. Ney planned to have Loison's men attack across a partly dismantled bridge directly south of Riesch's position. As soon as the bridge was secure, Murat would send cavalry across to help. Meanwhile, Malher would cross the Danube further east and then sweep west along the north bank. At 8:00 am, Ney sent the elite companies of Villatte's brigade across the bridge where they overpowered the bridge guard. French engineers quickly repaired the span so that when Riesch sent two battalions to interfere, they were driven back by a growing body of French reinforcements.

Villatte's brigade assaulted the main Austrian position, supported by Colbert's cavalry and ten cannons. Led personally by Ney, the 6th Light rapidly captured the Elchingen Abbey and all of Ober-Elchingen except a brickworks. The 39th Line was driven back by Austrian cavalry, but Loison brought up Roguet's brigade to help. The 69th Line helped roll Riesch's men back into the Grosser Forest. Threatened by Malher from the east and Dupont from the northeast, Riesch began pulling back. Colonel Charles, comte Lefebvre-Desnouettes's 18th Dragoons broke an Austrian square after it was softened up by musketry from the 76th Line. Colonel Auguste-Jean-Gabriel de Caulaincourt's 19th Dragoons also joined the pursuit. A final cavalry charge by the Austrians was checked by Roguet's brigade, then counter-charged by Colbert's horsemen.

== Results ==
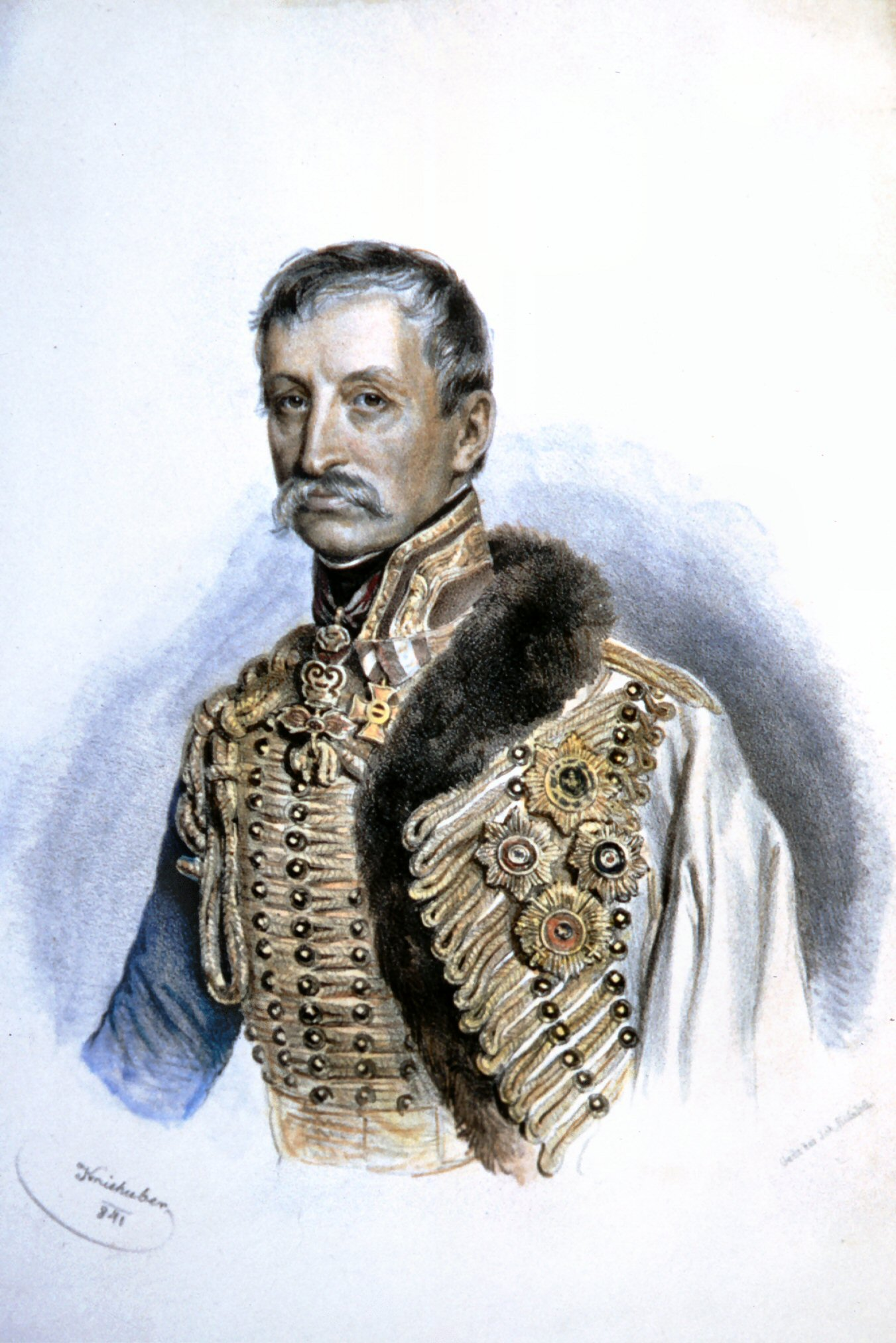
Archduke Ferdinand

The French admitted losing 56 officers and 737 men killed or wounded. They captured 4,000 Austrians and 4 cannon. Austrian killed and wounded may have been as high as 2,000.

Riesch's survivors retreated to Ulm where they were trapped with Mack. On 14 October Archduke Ferdinand took flight from the city with a cavalry regiment. At this time, large portions of the Austrian army remained outside Napoleon's net. Mack capitulated with 23,500 troops and 60 cannons in the Battle of Ulm on 20 October.

In several clashes over the next few days, Murat's pursuit mopped up most of Werneck's corps and other fleeing units. The French clashed with Feldmarschall-Leutnant Prince of Hohenzollern-Hechingen's division at Langenau on 16 October. The next day, Murat and Dupont cut General-Major Rudolf Sinzendorf's brigade to pieces at Herbrechtingen, capturing 2,500 Austrians. On 18 October, Murat and Ney forced Werneck to capitulate with 15,000 soldiers and 28 artillery pieces at Trochtelfingen. Only Archduke Ferdinand, Prince Hohenzollern, Schwarzenberg, Feldmarschall-Leutnant Ignaz Gyulai and 12 squadrons of cavalry escaped into Bohemia. Far to the south, the French eliminated another fragment of the shattered Austrian army when Jellacic surrendered 4,000 men to Marshal Pierre Augereau's 15,000-man VII Corps in the Capitulation of Dornbirn on 13 November. In 1808 Napoleon bestowed the title, the Duke of Elchingen upon Ney as a reward for his victory.

== Footnotes ==
Preceded by Battle of Haslach-Jungingen	Napoleonic Wars; Battle of Elchingen	Succeeded by Battle of Ulm
