= Pierre-Louis Binet de Marcognet =

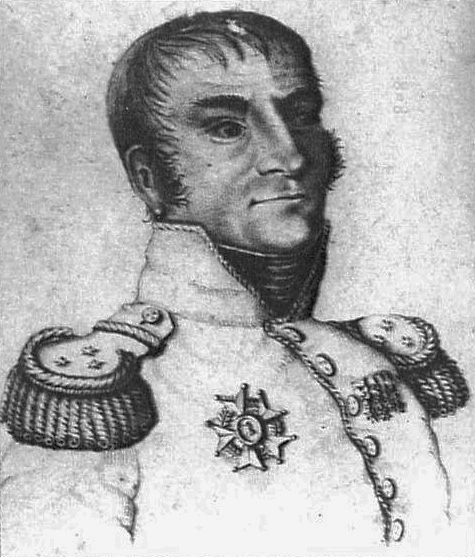
- General of Division Pierre-Louis Binet de Marcognet
- Born: 14 November 1765; Croix-Chapeau, Saintonge, France
- Died: 19 December 1854 (aged 89); Paris, France
- Military career
- Allegiance: Kingdom of France; Kingdom of the French; French First Republic; First French Empire; Bourbon Restoration
- Branch: Infantry
- Service years: 1781–1832
- Rank: General of Division
- Conflicts: American Revolutionary War; French Revolutionary Wars; Napoleonic Wars
- Awards: Légion d'Honneur; Order of Saint Louis; Order of the Iron Crown
- Other work: Baron of the Empire

Pierre-Louis Binet de Marcognet (French: [pjɛʁ lwi binɛ də maʁkɔɲɛ]; 14 November 1765 – 19 December 1854) joined the French army in 1781 as an officer cadet and fought in the American Revolutionary War. During the French Revolutionary Wars he fought in the Army of the Rhine and was wounded at First and Second Wissembourg. After being dismissed from the army for a year and a half for having noble blood, he resumed his military career and was wounded at Biberach and Kehl. Promoted to lead the 108th Line Infantry Demi-Brigade, he was in the thick of the fighting at Hohenlinden in 1800, where he was wounded and captured.

At the start of the Napoleonic Wars, Marcognet was a general officer commanding a brigade in Marshal of France Michel Ney's corps. He led his troops at Günzburg, Elchingen, and Scharnitz in 1805. In the 1806-1807 campaign, he led his brigade at Jena, Magdeburg, Eylau, Guttstadt-Deppen, and Friedland. After Ney's corps transferred to Spain, he fought at Tamames, Alba de Tormes, Ciudad Rodrigo, Almeida, Bussaco, Torres Vedras, Casal Novo, and Fuentes de Onoro.

Marcognet commanded a division in the Italian campaign of 1813-1814, fighting at Caldiero, Boara Pisani, the Mincio, and other actions. In 1815, he led a division at Waterloo where it was broken by cavalry after an initial success. Marcognet is one of the names inscribed under the Arc de Triomphe, on Column 7.

== Revolution ==
Marcognet was born on 14 November 1765 in Croix-Chapeau in Saintonge province, which is now the Charente-Maritime department. His parents were Louis-Nicolas, Count of Marcognet and Suzanne-Emilie Pintault, the count's first wife Suzanne-Louise Guicheneux having died on 30 March 1764. His great-grandfather, the Marquis de Montblin (died 1717) had been governor of La Rochelle, Saintonge, and Aunis. Marcognet entered the Bourbonnais Infantry Regiment as a cadet on 13 March 1781 and became a sous lieutenant in July 1781. He served in the American Revolutionary War under Jean-Baptiste Donatien de Vimeur, comte de Rochambeau from 1781 to 1783. Promoted to lieutenant in 1787 and captain in 1792, he was assigned to the Army of the Rhine at the start of the War of the First Coalition. Marcognet was wounded in the right thigh on 14 September 1793 in fighting along the Lauter River. This was one of the skirmishes that preceded the First Battle of Wissembourg. In November he earned a name for himself in action near Saverne. He was wounded again at the Second Battle of Wissembourg when the French retook the Lines of Wissembourg.

In December 1793, Marcognet was dismissed from the army because he was a nobleman and therefore a suspected enemy of the revolution. Indeed, his paternal uncle Binet de Jasson was equerry to King Louis XVI while his aunt Madame de Soran was a maid of honor to Princess Élisabeth. His noble family was torn apart by the French Revolution. Two of his brothers died fighting in the War in the Vendée while a third brother was shot at Neuf-Brisach for carrying a message to Louis Joseph, Prince of Condé, an Émigré leader. Readmitted to the army in July 1795 after the Reign of Terror, he resumed the rank of captain.

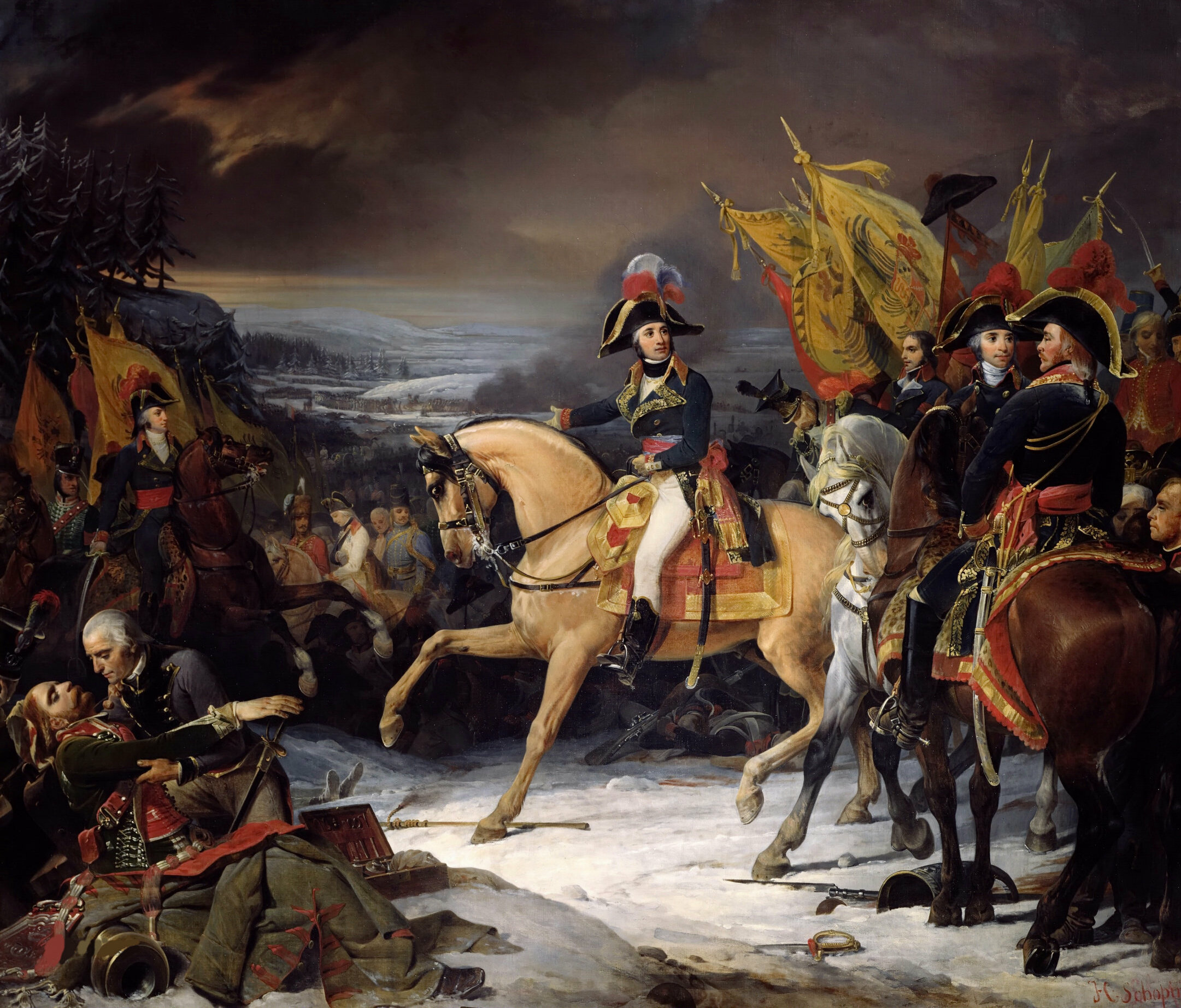
The Battle of Hohenlinden by Henri Frédéric Schopin

On 24 August 1795, Marcognet transferred to the 10th Light Infantry Demi-Brigade. With his new unit he fought under Jean Victor Marie Moreau at the Battle of Ettlingen on 9 July 1796 and was promoted to chef de bataillon (major) the following day. He led a provisional battalion at the Battle of Neresheim on 11 August and at Geisenfeld on 1 September. Marcognet was wounded during a French victory at the Battle of Biberach on 2 October. At the Siege of Kehl he was shot in the right arm. Subsequently, Charles Pichegru appointed him to lead a battalion in the 95th Line Infantry Demi-Brigade.

Marcognet received promotion to Adjutant General (colonel) in the 108th Line Infantry Demi-Brigade on 18 June 1800. At the Battle of Hohenlinden on 3 December 1800, the 2,234-strong 108th Line served in Emmanuel Grouchy's division of Moreau's army. As the head of Johann Kollowrat's Left Center Column advanced along the main highway from the east, they bumped into Marcognet's 108th Line at about 7:00 AM. He deployed his troops in line along the edge of a forest. Franz Löpper, who led the Austro-Bavarian advance guard, immediately ordered his 5,341 foot soldiers and 1,319 cavalrymen to attack. Showing tactical finesse, Marcognet repulsed the first attack by the Benjowski Infantry Regiment Nr. 31 with the help of the 4th Hussars and three cannons. Outnumbered two-to-one, he was holding his ground when enemy reinforcements arrived. Using a forest trail, Lelio Spannochi secretly posted the Sebottendorf Grenadier Battalion on the flank of the 108th Line and charged. Surprised, the French rapidly retreated leaving the wounded Marcognet to be captured.

One of the corps commanders at Hohenlinden, Paul Grenier, called Marcognet, "a highly meritorious officer in every respect, worthy of the command entrusted to him." Jacques Louis François Delaistre de Tilly described him as, "a very distinguished officer, zealous and active." He was promoted to general of brigade on 29 August 1803.

== Early Empire ==
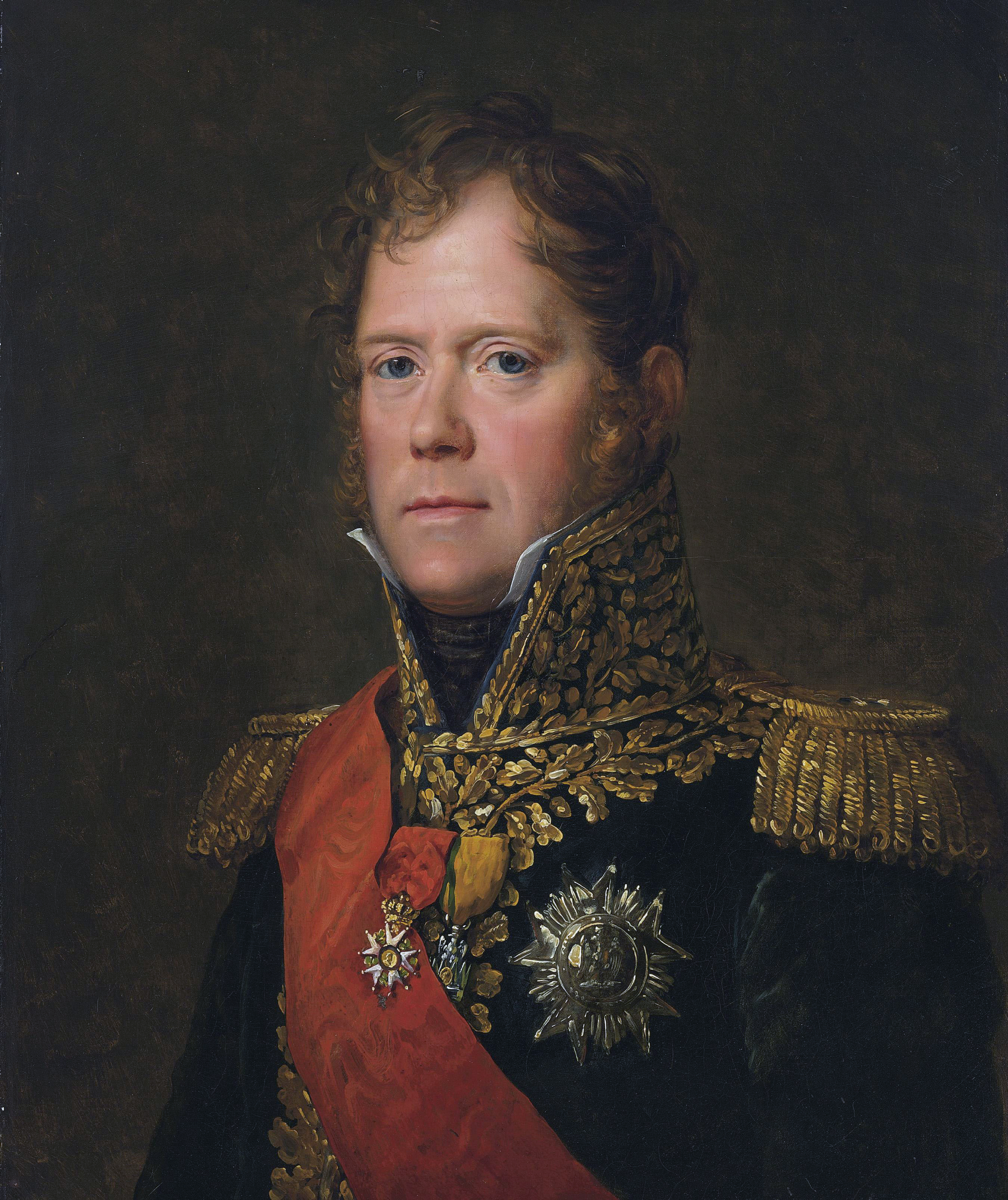
Marshal Michel Ney

Marcognet became a member of the Légion d'Honneur on 10 December 1804 and received the cross of the Légion d'Honneur from Emperor Napoleon on 14 June 1805. In the War of the Third Coalition he was assigned to Jean-Pierre Firmin Malher's 3rd Division of Marshal Michel Ney's VI Corps. At the Battle of Günzburg on 9 October 1805 he led Malher's center column in an attempt to seize the Danube bridge. His troops overran the Austrian covering force, capturing Konstantin Ghilian Karl d'Aspré, 200 men, and two cannons. Marcognet ordered four cannons to provide covering fire as the French tried to rebuild the destroyed span, but the troops were driven back by intense hostile fire. Mahler's division was present at the Battle of Elchingen on 14 October but it was mostly kept in reserve. Marcognet fought at Scharnitz in the Tyrol on 4 November.

At the start of the War of the Fourth Coalition, Marcognet commanded a brigade in Gaspard Amédée Gardanne's division of Marshal Michel Ney's VI Corps. The brigade consisted of the 1st and 2nd Battalions of the 25th Light Infantry Regiment. He led his troops at the Battle of Jena on 14 June 1806 and at the Siege of Magdeburg from 22 October to 11 November. Ney's corps arrived at the Battle of Eylau at 7:15 PM on 8 February 1807.

Marcognet fought in Baptiste Pierre Bisson's division at the Battle of Guttstadt-Deppen on 5 and 6 June 1807. In this action, Ney's 17,000 troops executed a brilliant rearguard action against over 63,000 Russians. Marcognet participated in the Battle of Friedland on 14 June. Bisson's division formed Ney's left flank. After initial success, a massed Russian cavalry charge against Bisson's left flank stopped Ney's attack cold. However, Claude Perrin Victor's corps drove back their enemies, allowing Ney's troops to rally and capture the town of Pravdinsk (Friedland).

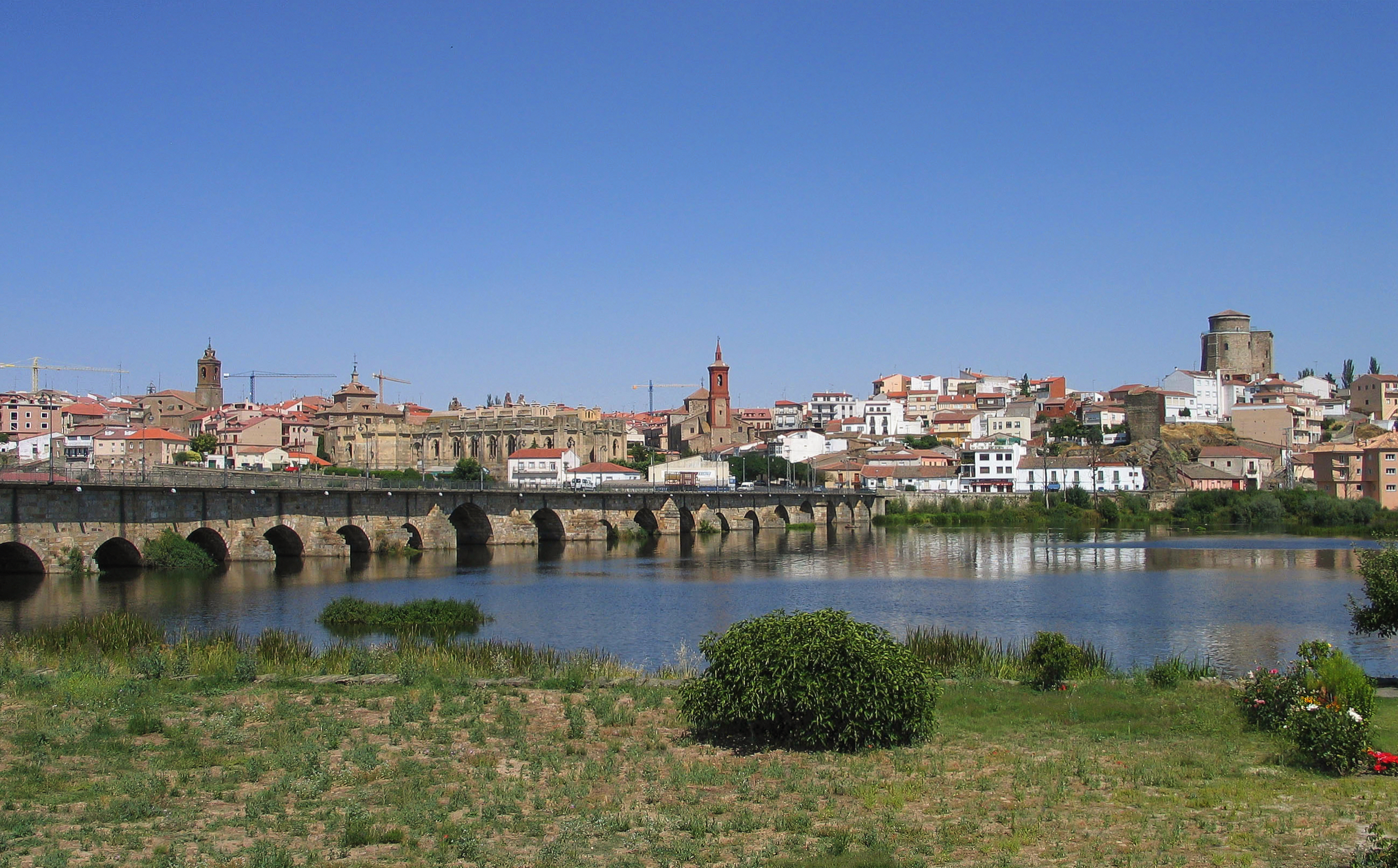
Bridge at Alba de Tormes

In 1808 Napoleon granted Marcognet the title of Baron of the Empire. By 1809 he was with Ney's corps in northwest Spain, fighting in the Peninsular War. After trying without success to suppress the insurrection in Galicia, Ney abandoned the province in June. In the fall, Ney went on leave, leaving Jean Gabriel Marchand in command. When a Spanish army under the Duke of Del Parque took a position at Tamames, Marchand rushed to engage it with 14,000 soldiers and 14 guns. Del Parque arranged his 20,000 infantry, 1,500 cavalry, and 18 guns on a ridge south of the town. In the Battle of Tamames on 18 October 1809, the French commander sent Antoine Louis Popon de Maucune to attack the Spanish left while the 25th Light Infantry Regiment pinned the Spanish right. When the two efforts tied up Del Parque's troops, Marcognet's six battalions would smash through the enemy center. Maucune's six battalions made good progress at first, then stalled. At this moment, Marcognet's assault lurched forward and was soon being pounded by 12 guns. Mounting a steep slope, the French columns were riddled by Spanish musketry and fell into confusion. When the Spanish counterattacked, Marcognet's troops fled back down the ridge, prompting Marchand to bring up his reserves and call off the battle. French casualties in the fiasco numbered 1,400, the Spanish only 700.

Under the overall command of François Étienne de Kellermann, the VI Corps and a dragoon division overcame Del Parque's army at the Battle of Alba de Tormes on 26 November in a lopsided victory. While the cavalry inflicted most of the damage, the infantry arrived in time to capture the bridge and town. At the time of the Siege of Ciudad Rodrigo from April to July 1810 and the subsequent Siege of Almeida from July to August 1810, Marcognet led a brigade in Marchand's 1st Division.

On 15 September 1810, Marcognet's 2nd Brigade consisted of 1,686 men of the 39th Line Infantry Regiment under Jacques-Pierre Soyer and the 1,790-strong 76th Line Infantry Regiment led by Jean Chemineau. He led these units in Marshal André Masséna's invasion of Portugal. Marchand's division lost 1,173 men in its futile attack during the Battle of Bussaco on 27 September. During the retreat from Portugal in early March 1811, Marcognet's brigade was detached to assist Louis-Pierre Montbrun's cavalry. After rejoining his division, his brigade fought in rearguard actions at Redinha, Casal Novo, and Foz do Arouce between 12 and 15 March. The first action was a draw, the second a French success, but in the last skirmish, the 39th Line lost its eagle. Marcognet led his men in the Battle of Fuentes de Onoro. On 5 May, Marchand's division overran the hamlet of Pozo Bello, but the French were unable to secure a victory. On 6 August 1811, Marcognet received promotion to general of division. On 6 February 1812 he took command of the 14th Military Division.

== Late Empire ==
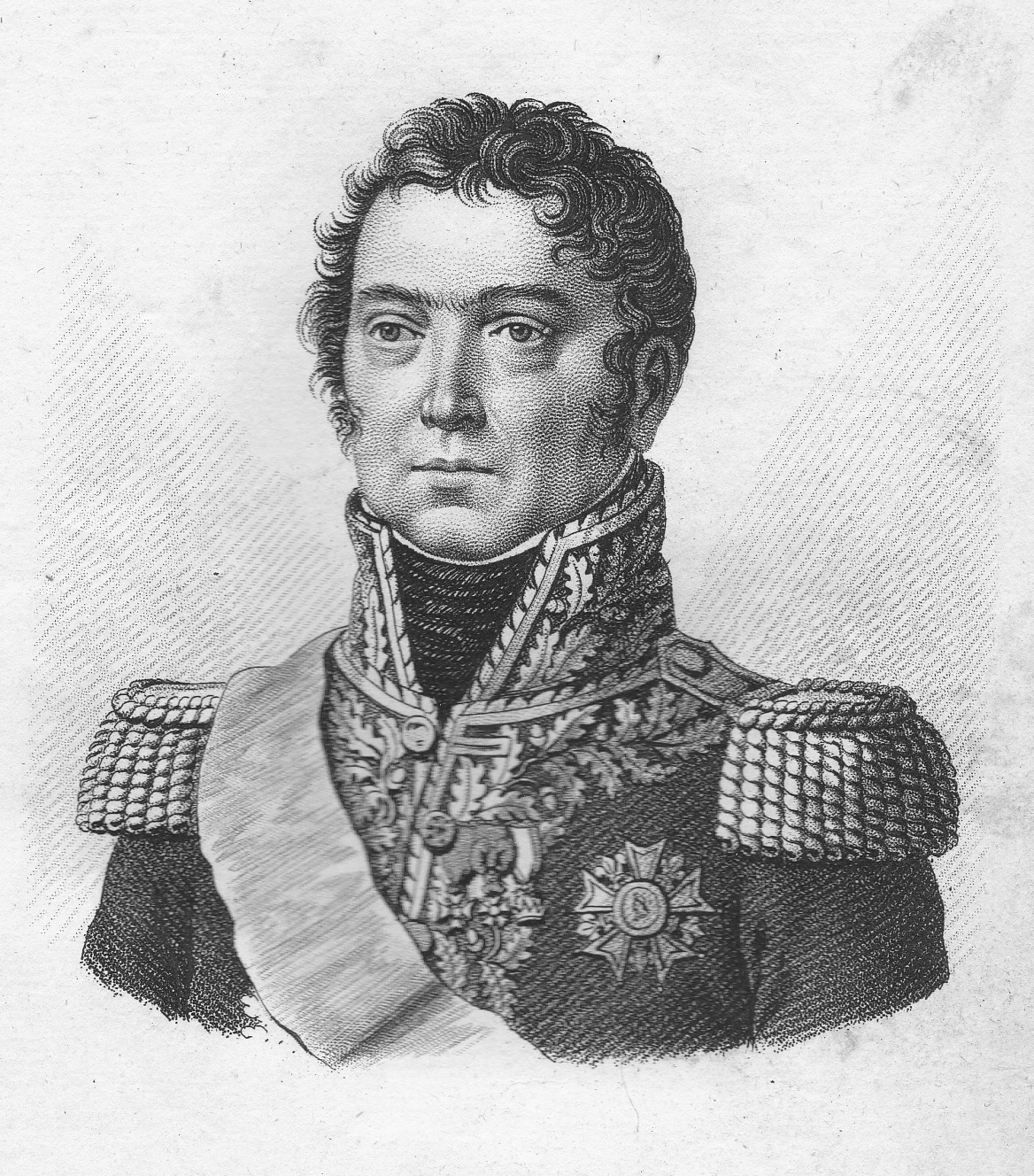
Marcognet's corps commander in 1813–1814 was Paul Grenier.

After Napoleon's disastrous campaign in Russia in 1812, one Italian and three French divisions from the garrison of Italy were sent to Germany as reinforcements. By recalling the Italian units serving under Marshal Louis Gabriel Suchet in Spain and mass conscription, an entirely new army was formed and placed under Napoleon's step-son, Eugène de Beauharnais. By May 1813, the new Italian army consisted of the 46th, 47th, 48th, and 49th Infantry Divisions, plus one cavalry division. In June, the 50th, 51st, and 52nd Divisions were added. Marcognet received command of the 48th Division. In August 1813, the division consisted of three battalions each of the 29th and 30th Provisional Demi-Brigades, four battalions of the 106th Line Infantry Regiment, and three battalions each of the 1st and 2nd Neapolitan Line Infantry Regiments.

After the Austrian Empire's declaration of war on 12 August 1813, Eugène moved his army east to defend Illyria. At the end of September, the Franco-Italian army abandoned Illyria and fell back to the Soča (Isonzo) River. After a pause, the Franco-Italian army retreated again, this time to the Adige River, which was reached at the end of October. In early November, Eugène reorganized the army and Marcognet emerged as commander of the 4th Division in Paul Grenier's corps. The 1st Brigade, which was commanded by Jean-Baptiste Jeanin, comprised the 29th and 31st Provisional Demi-Brigades. The 2nd Brigade under Vincent Martel Deconchy included the 36th Light, 102nd Line, and 106th Line Infantry Regiments. The 29th Provisional was formed from one battalion each of the 20th and 101st Line; the 31st Provisional was composed of single battalions of the 131st and 132nd Line.

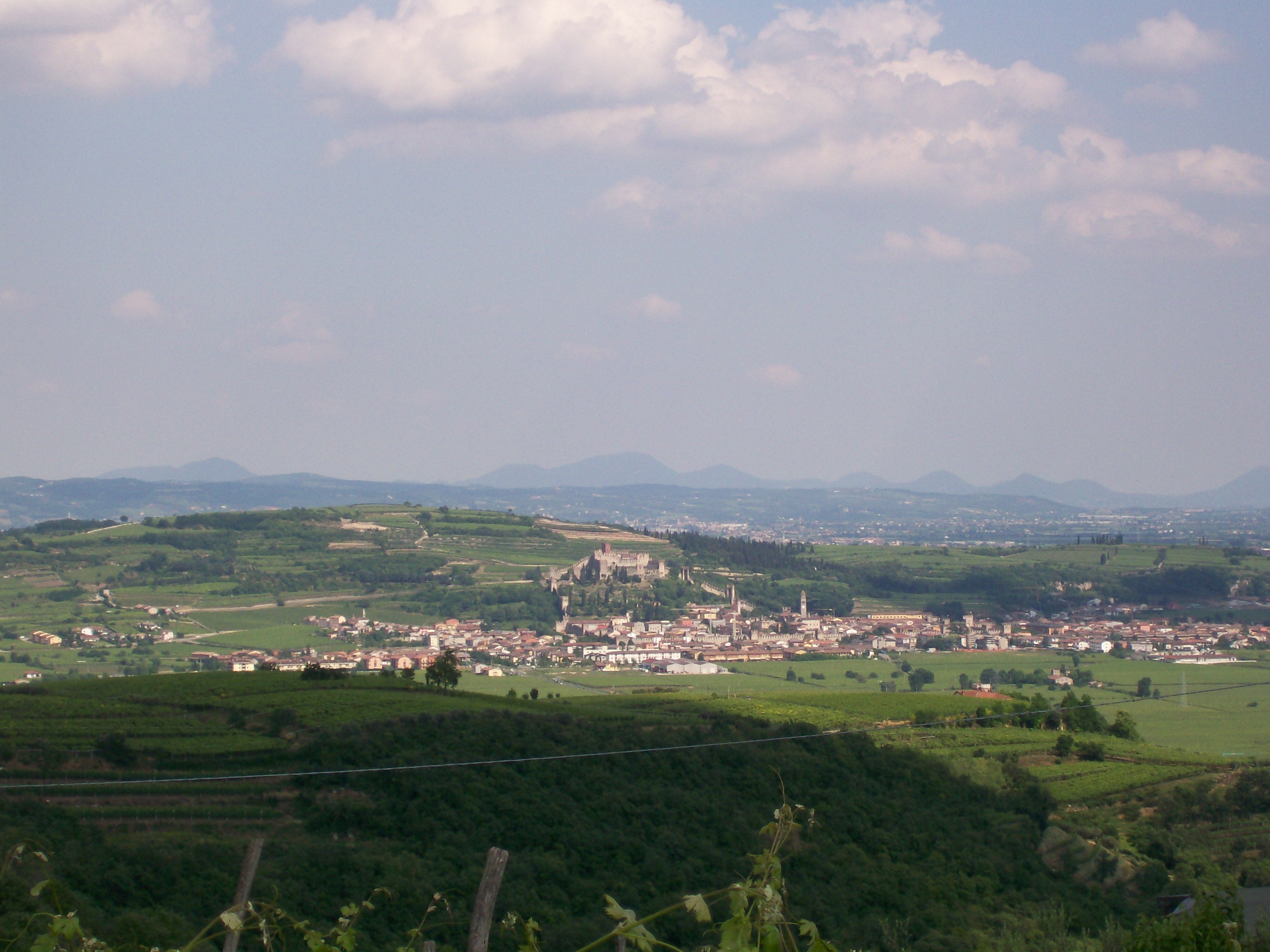
In the Battle of Caldiero, the French advanced in the same easterly direction as this photo of Soave.

In the Battle of Caldiero on 15 November 1813, Eugène ordered Marcognet's division to attack Johann von Hiller's Austrian center while François Jean Baptiste Quesnel's division turned the enemy right flank. Meanwhile, Marie François Rouyer's division and a cavalry brigade pressed the Austrian left flank. Beginning at 10:00 AM, Marcognet drove back the Austrian center while the other attacks went forward. The day ended in a Franco-Italian success with the Austrians forced back to Soave. Each side suffered about 500 casualties, but the Austrians also lost 900 soldiers and two guns captured. Having given his enemies a sharp blow, Eugène fell back to Verona, leaving Marcognet's division on the east bank of the Adige at San Michele. Hiller attacked the French on 18 November but was eventually repulsed after hard fighting. In this encounter, the Austrians lost 1,200 killed and wounded, plus 200 captured, while French casualties numbered 700, including Grenier wounded.

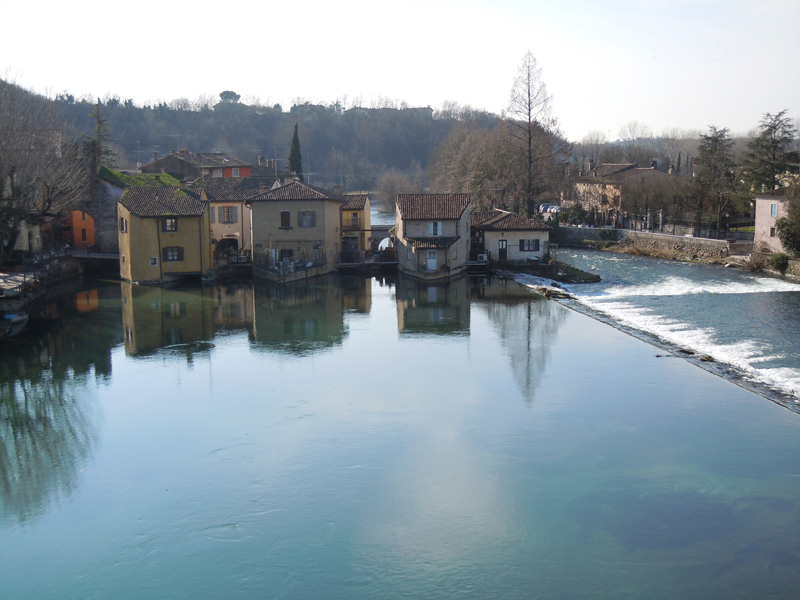
The west side of Valeggio sul Mincio near Borghetto

After De Conchy's brigade was defeated on the Lower Adige, Eugène sent Marcognet's entire division to defend the area in early December. With his own division plus Nicolas Schmitz's brigade of Rouyer's, Marcognet attacked Anton Gundacker von Starhemberg's 6,000 Austrians at Boara Pisani on 8 December 1813. Though he had 12,000 men and 18 guns, Marcognet only brought 5,000 into the battle. After initial success, the French halted only to be thrown back by a counterattack at 10:00 PM. The French lost 800 killed and wounded plus 102 captured, while Austrian casualties were somewhat fewer.

Marcognet led his division at the Battle of the Mincio River on 8 February 1814. The Franco-Italian army advanced and blundered into Count Heinrich von Bellegarde's Austrian army, resulting in a confused meeting engagement. Eugène and Grenier advanced across the Mincio River on the right and center, pushing back the Austrians in front of them. The divisions of Rouyer and Quesnel led the attack with cavalry on both flanks, supported by Marcognet and Teodoro Lechi's Italian Guard. Meanwhile, Jean-Antoine Verdier's troops were barely holding out against greatly superior Austrian forces on the left flank. As Eugène directed Rouyer and Quesnel to the left to help Verdier, he brought Marcognet into the first line. In the end, the French advance was halted by a mass of Austrians and both sides pulled back. The French suffered 3,000 killed and wounded plus 500 captured, while inflicting losses of 2,800 killed and wounded and 1,200 captured on the Austrians.

On the night of 9 February 1814, Bellegarde pushed 10,000 foot soldiers and 2,000 horsemen across the river at Borghetto near Valeggio sul Mincio. After tough fighting, the divisions of Marcognet and Philibert Fressinet drove the Austrians back to the east bank. After this action, Bellegarde abandoned any attempt to force the Mincio and waited for Joachim Murat's Neapolitan army to join him from southern Italy. This was followed by a period of confused fighting as Eugène tried to fend off both Bellegarde and Murat. On 10 March, Eugène launched a reconnaissance in force across the Mincio. At Goito, Jeanin's 3,000-strong brigade of Marcognet's division fought Friedrich Ernst von Spiegel's 4,300 Austrians. Each side employed six pieces of artillery and the action is called an Austrian victory, though no casualties are stated. The campaign ended on 17 April 1814 after Napoleon's abdication when Eugène agreed to evacuate Italy. Marcognet was awarded the Order of the Iron Crown. After the end of the conflict he was taken off active service. King Louis XVIII made him a Chevalier of the Order of Saint Louis on 8 July 1814 and Grand Officer of the Légion d'Honneur on 27 December.

== Waterloo ==
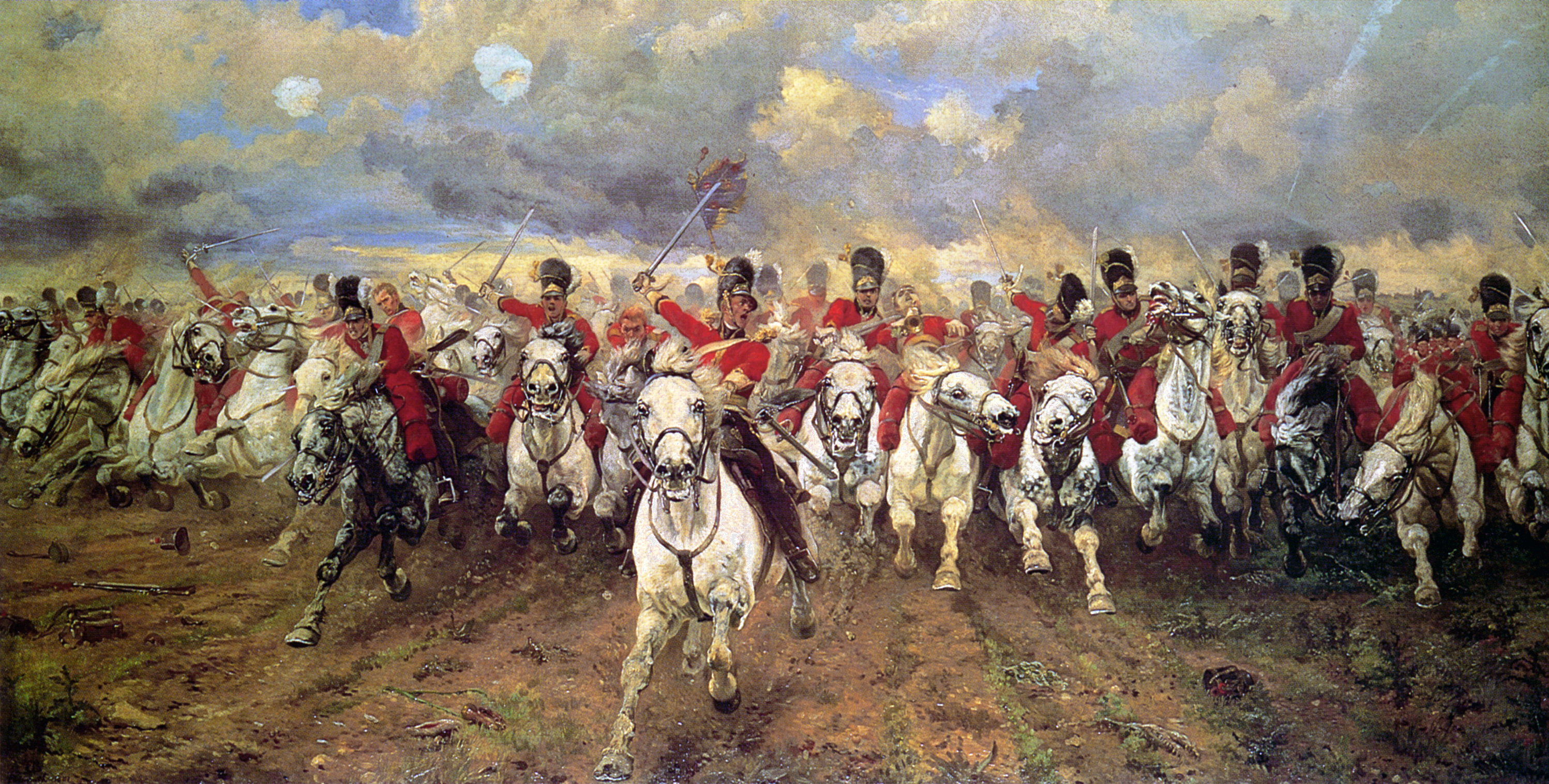
Scotland Forever! by Lady Elizabeth Butler. At Waterloo, the Scots Greys rode completely through Marcognet's division, routing it.

At the Battle of Waterloo on 18 June 1815, Marcognet commanded the 3rd Division in Jean-Baptiste Drouet, Comte d'Erlon's I Corps. Antoine Nogues' 1st Brigade consisted of the 21st and 46th Line Infantry Regiments. Jean-Georges Grenier's 2nd Brigade included the 25th and 45th Line Infantry Regiments. There were a total of eight battalions. The division was posted in the first line on the right flank, with Pierre François Joseph Durutte's 4th Division on its right and François-Xavier Donzelot's 2nd Division on its left. According to historian David G. Chandler, Marcognet's 4,200-man division was formed with seven battalions each deployed in three-deep line with four pace intervals between battalions. The formation was 200 yards (183 m) or 200 men wide while its depth was 52 yards (48 m). The French called this tactical formation the Colonne de Division par Bataillon.

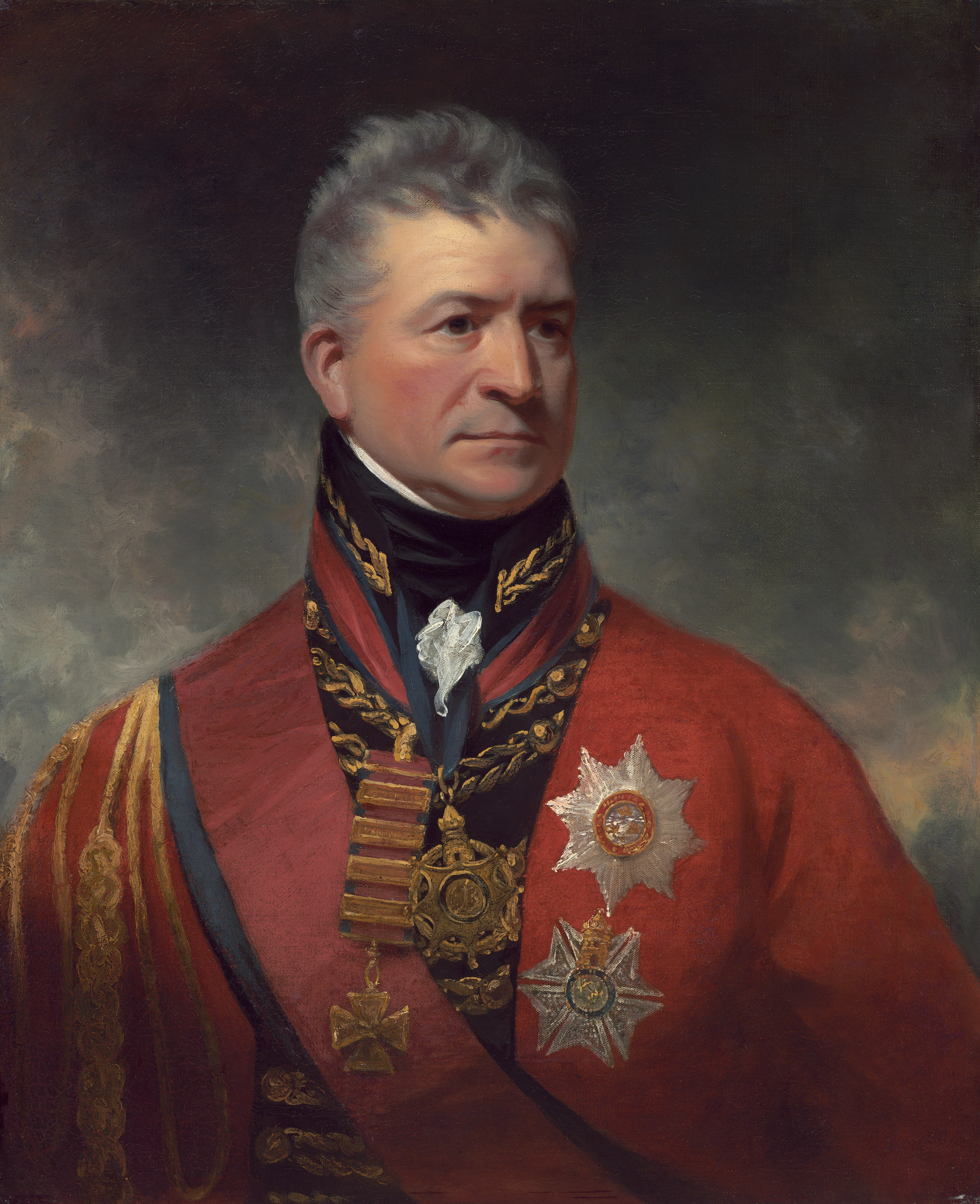
Portrait of Thomas Picton by William Beechey, c.1815. Picton was killed during Marcognet's attack

After d'Erlon's attack commenced, Joachim Jerome Quiot du Passage's 1st Division encountered the British 95th Rifles in the gravel pit and inclined to its right. This movement caused the 2nd Division to hesitate and Marcognet's division surged several hundred yards into the lead. The Netherlands 7th and 8th National Militia Battalions engaged in a fire fight with the French skirmishers, taking some loss. Suddenly, the skirmishers fell back to reveal the front rank of Marcognet's column at close range. The French fired a tremendous volley from 400 muskets which inflicted heavy losses on the militiamen, who immediately retired on the second line. The men of Rogers' nearby battery abandoned their position and spiked one of their own guns. As Denis Pack ordered his British brigade forward from the second line, the battalion of the 45th Line in Marcognet's front rank found itself being attacked by the 92nd Foot, a Scottish Highland regiment. The Highlanders fired into the mass before them at a range of 20 yards (18 m) but their volley was not fully effective because of their four-deep line formation. Overlapping the 92nd on both flanks, the 45th Line fired another crushing volley, throwing the Highlanders into confusion. At this moment, the British division commander Thomas Picton fell dead from a bullet in his forehead. The 3rd Division began to shout, "Victory".

Suddenly, the 2nd Scots Greys Dragoon Regiment appeared behind the 92nd and plowed into Marcognet's division. The effect was catastrophic. The British cavalrymen, mounted on large horses, rained sword-cuts on the French foot soldiers as they hewed a bloody path through the formation. During the one-sided melee, the 45th Line lost its eagle. The Scots Greys rode completely through the 3rd Division, but were repulsed by one of Durutte's brigades. Those Frenchmen who were untouched by British heavy cavalry swords immediately fled back toward their own lines chased by the British and Netherlands infantry. Altogether, about 3,000 prisoners were gathered up from d'Erlon's four divisions, all of which were broken by cavalry. Late in the day, Marcognet got together a rump of his division in order to support the final assault on La Haye Sainte. Shortly before the defeat of the Old Guard's final attack, the remnant of the 3rd Division rallied to attack one last time.

Marcognet was retired from the army on 9 September 1815 and not employed for 15 years. After the July Revolution of 1830, the new government admitted him into the army reserve on 7 February 1831. His final retirement came on 1 May 1832. He died in Paris on 19 December 1854 and is buried in the Père Lachaise Cemetery with his wife, Julie Catherine Le Monnier (1795–1866).
