= Battle of Günzburg =

1805 battle during the War of the Third Coalition

- Part of the Ulm campaign within the War of the Third Coalition
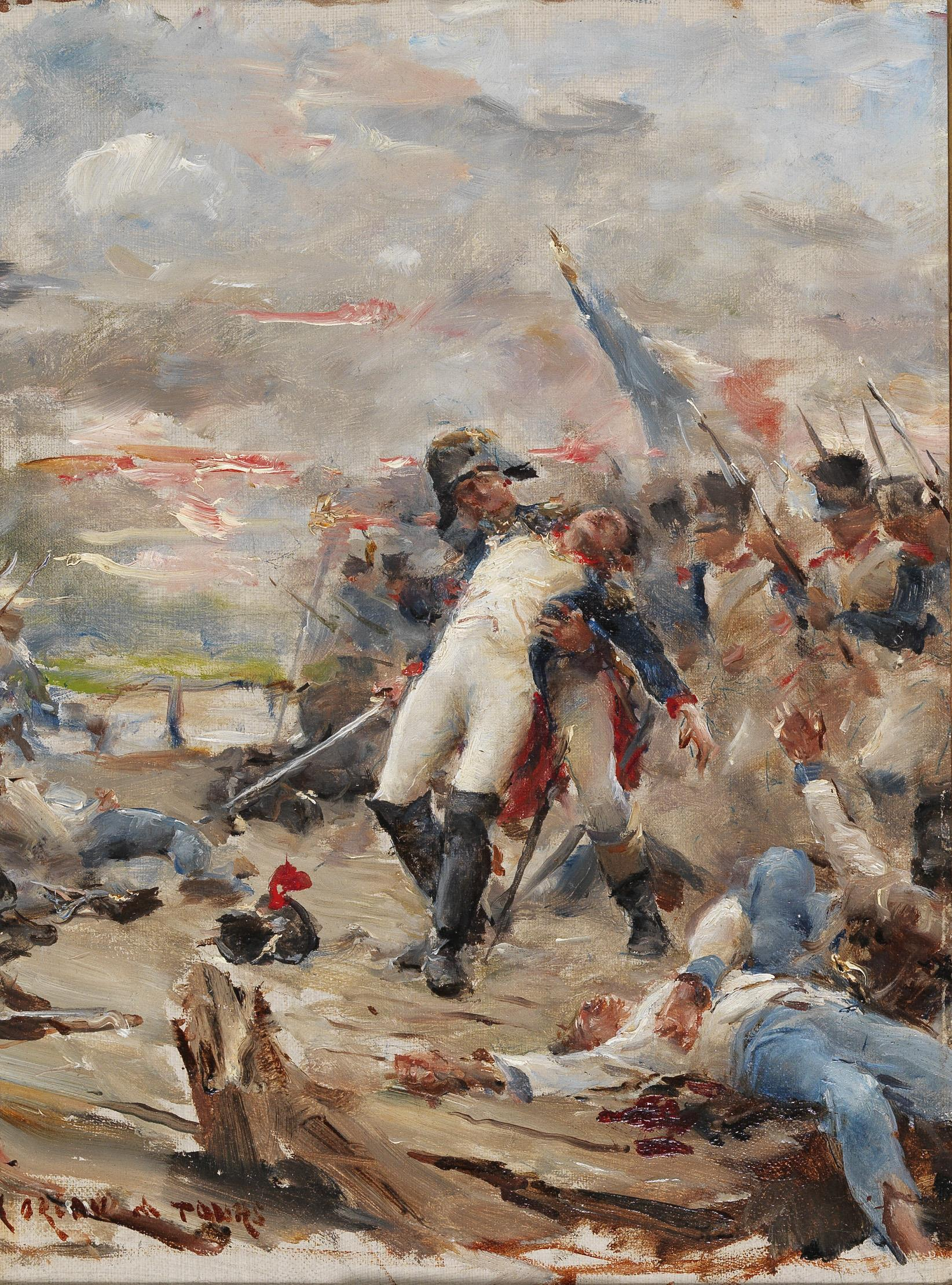
- Death of Colonel Gérard Lacuée at the battle of Günzburg, on 9 October 1805. Oil painting by Georges Moreau de Tours.
Date	9 October 1805
Location	Günzburg, modern-day Germany 48°27.16′N 10°16.28′E
Result	French victory

Belligerents
France	Austria

Commanders and leaders
Michel Ney; Jean Malher	Karl Mack

Units involved
VI Corps	

Strength
8,000; 6 guns	Over 7,000; 26 guns

Casualties and losses
700	2,000; 6 guns

War of the Third Coalition:
Ulm Campaign
current battle
Napoleon in command
Napoleon not in command

The Battle of Günzburg on 9 October 1805 saw General of Division Jean-Pierre Firmin Malher's French division attempt to seize a crossing over the Danube River at Günzburg by the order of Marshal Michel Ney in the face of a Habsburg Austrian army led by Feldmarschall-Leutnant Karl Mack von Lieberich. Malher's division managed to capture a bridge and hold it against Austrian counterattacks. The battle occurred during the War of the Third Coalition, part of the larger Napoleonic Wars.

After Mack's Austrian army invaded Bavaria, it found itself the target of a powerful offensive by the army of Emperor Napoleon I of France. When Napoleon's corps threatened to envelop Mack's army, the Austrian general unwisely held his ground near the city of Ulm. As the French armies blocked the Austrian retreat routes to the east, Mack attempted to move his army to the south bank of the Danube. After receiving orders to seize the Danube bridges, Marshal Michel Ney sent Malher to capture the crossing at Günzburg. Malher's main attack on two bridges failed in the face of a vigorous Austrian defense. However, a late-arriving French unit captured the eastern bridge that had just been rebuilt by the Austrians and was able to hold on to it until evening. Discouraged by the encounter, Mack ordered his soldiers to march back to Ulm which is 22 kilometers west-southwest of Günzburg.

== Background ==
=== War plans ===
Austria, defeated by France in the War of the Second Coalition and forced to accept a French client state in Italy, planned to take revenge. In November 1804, Austria made a secret alliance with the Russian Empire whereby Austria's 235,000 soldiers would be supported by 115,000 Russian troops and financial backing from Great Britain. The head of the Austrian army, Feldmarschall Archduke Charles, Duke of Teschen believed his soldiers were not ready for war, but the pro-war faction at the court of Emperor Francis I of Austria outmaneuvered him.

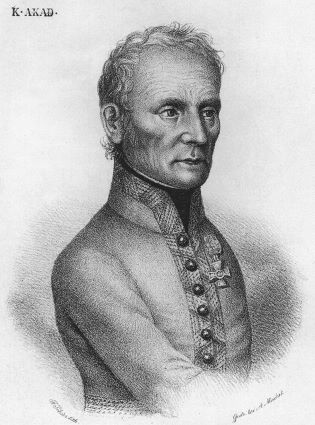
Karl Mack von Lieberich developed the war plan.

Feldmarschall-Leutnant Karl Mack von Lieberich, who had the full confidence of the emperor, became largely responsible for developing Austria's war plan. Mack's strategy called for 120,000 troops in Italy commanded by Charles, 25,000 in the County of Tyrol under Archduke John of Austria, 70,000 in Bavaria under Feldmarschall-Leutnant Archduke Ferdinand Karl Joseph of Austria-Este, and 20,000 in reserve. Mack would accompany Ferdinand's force, which would be joined by a Russian army and attack across the Rhine River into France. Charles would sweep across Italy and invade southern France. It was hoped that the Kingdom of Prussia could be induced to join the coalition. Mack convinced Emperor Francis I that he should invade Bavaria first, while Charles marked time in Italy. The general believed that by the time Napoleon intervened in Bavaria, the Russian army would have arrived to help the Austrians. This erroneous assumption caused Mack and the war hawks to fall into "a comedy of errors". Foreseeing trouble with Mack's plan, Charles talked the emperor into transferring 30,000 soldiers from Italy to Germany, but these troops would arrive too late to remedy the situation.

Napoleon's Grande Armée numbered 219,000 soldiers and consisted of seven corps, the Reserve Cavalry, and the Imperial Guard. Marshal Jean-Baptiste Bessières led the 7,000-strong Imperial Guard; Marshal Jean-Baptiste Bernadotte commanded the 17,000-man I Corps; General of Division Auguste Marmont directed the 20,000 troops of the II Corps; Marshal Louis Davout controlled 26,000 soldiers of the III Corps; Marshal Soult led the 40,000-strong IV Corps; Marshal Jean Lannes had 18,000 men in the V Corps; Marshal Michel Ney commanded the 24,000 soldiers of the VI Corps; Marshal Pierre Augereau directed the 14,000-man VII Corps. Marshal Joachim Murat led the Cavalry Reserve with 22,000 troopers in seven divisions, while the Artillery Reserve had 5,000 gunners.

In the summer of 1805, the Grande Armée lay in its camps on the English Channel. Napoleon planned for the Grande Armée to march to the Rhine, then execute a vast right wheel from the Rhine to the Danube, picking up his 25,000 Bavarian allies on the way. Meanwhile, Marshal André Masséna with 50,000 troops would hold Archduke Charles in northern Italy, assisted by 20,000 reinforcements from central Italy led by General of Division Laurent Gouvion Saint-Cyr. Marshal Guillaume Marie Anne Brune would remain on the northern coast of France with 30,000 soldiers. Napoleon issued his marching orders on 26 August.

=== Operations ===
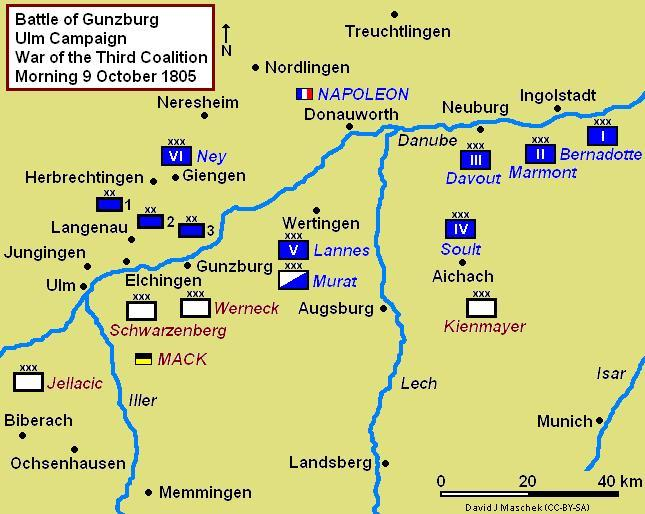
Battle of Gunzburg Campaign Map, situation morning 9 October 1805

On 8 September, the army of Archduke Ferdinand invaded the Electorate of Bavaria, with a plan to defend the line of the Lech River. The Bavarian army acted according to its secret treaty with France and marched north to the Main River. Mack changed the plan on 12 September and insisted that the army continue to advance farther west to the Iller River. Ferdinand and the army chief of staff General-major Anton Mayer von Heldensfeld both opposed the move and appealed to the emperor. Francis, however, upheld his favorite Mack and dismissed Mayer from his position. Relations between the archduke and Mack deteriorated to the point where the two communicated only in writing.

On 24 September, Napoleon's corps began crossing the Rhine. Lannes corps and part of Murat's cavalry advanced directly east into the Black Forest to trick the Austrians into believing it to be the main attack. But the real attack was coming from the northwest, and on 2 October the line of corps acted like "a door swinging on its hinges" as the corps angled south, aiming for Ingolstadt and Donauwörth on the Danube.

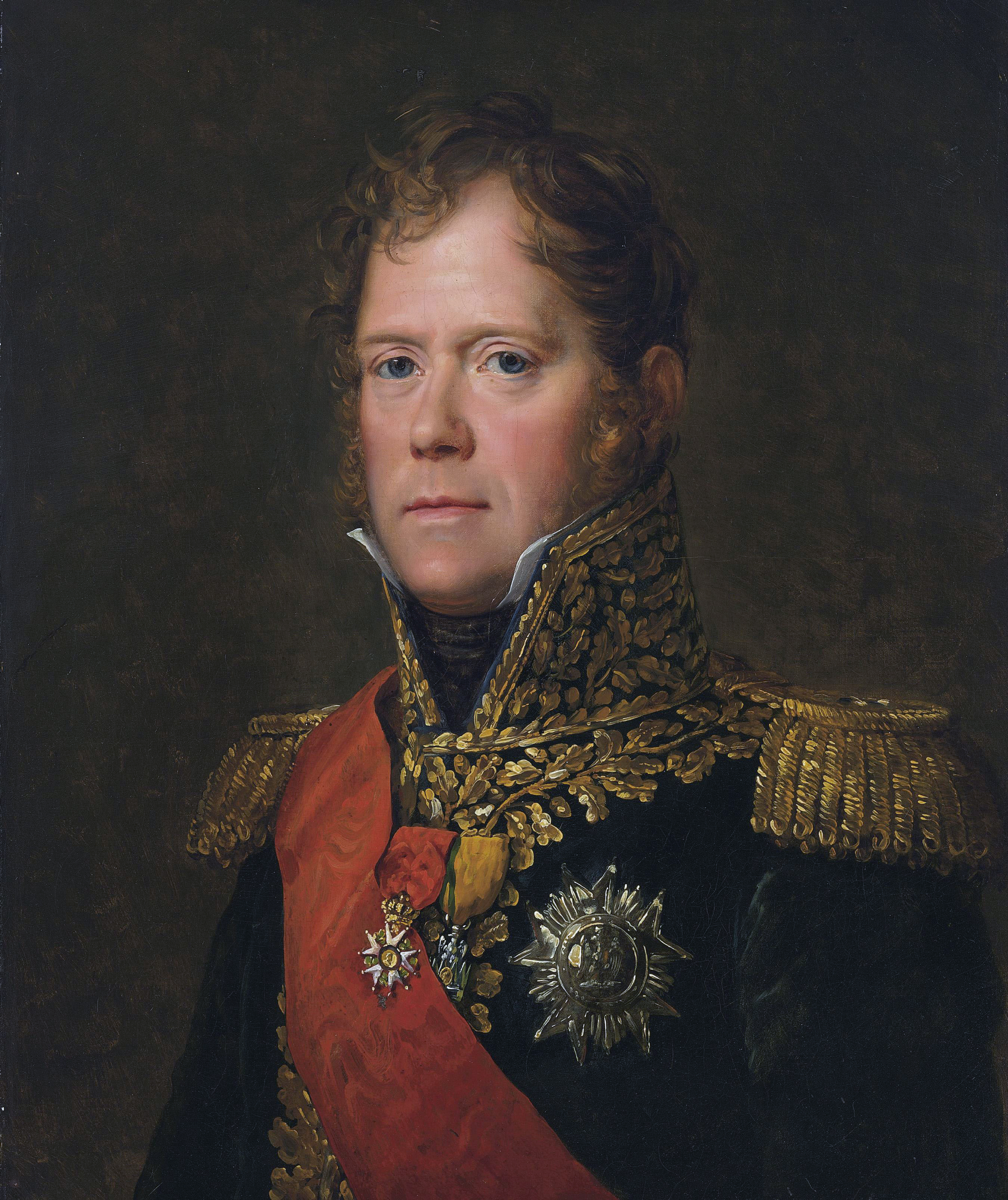
Marshal Michel Ney ordered Malher to attack.

By 7 October, Napoleon's corps had reached the Danube and secured crossing points. When he became aware of the French threat, Mack made the questionable decision to stand at Ulm. To oppose the French, Mack organized his army into four corps under Feldmarschall-Leutnant Karl Philipp, Prince of Schwarzenberg with 28 infantry battalions and 30 cavalry squadrons, Feldmarschall-Leutnant Franz von Werneck with 30 battalions and 24 squadrons, Feldmarschall-Leutnant Michael von Kienmayer with 19 battalions and 34 squadrons, and Feldmarschall-Leutnant Franz Jellacic with 15,000 in 16 battalions, six Jäger companies, and six squadrons. Schwarzenberg massed at Ulm, Werneck defended Günzburg, and Kienmayer held Ingolstadt. Meanwhile, Jellacic's troops held a line farther south near Biberach an der Riß where they were watching the Black Forest. Mack apparently made no preparations to defend the line of the Danube. Instead, he planned to strike at Napoleon's lines of communication stretching back to France.

The French easily penetrated Kienmayer's outnumbered cordon defense of the Danube at Donauwörth. After a series of minor clashes, Kienmayer retreated southwest toward Munich via Aichach. Lannes, Murat, and Soult crossed the Danube near Donauworth. On 8 October, Lannes and Murat marched southwest and collided with Feldmarschall-Leutnant Franz Xaver von Auffenberg's division in the Battle of Wertingen. The French crushed Auffenberg's isolated force and forced it back toward Ulm. On this day, Soult marched toward Aichach and Davout reached the Danube at Neuburg an der Donau, while Bernadotte and Marmont arrived at Ingolstadt. Ney marched to Donauwörth, but he never crossed the Danube and instead moved west to Giengen while following orders to proceed to Ulm. Napoleon judged that Mack would try to retreat through Augsburg or Landsberg am Lech and sent his corps to block those routes. He rejected the idea that the Austrians would cross to the Danube's north bank and attack his supply lines. In fact, that what exactly what Mack was contemplating.

== Battle ==
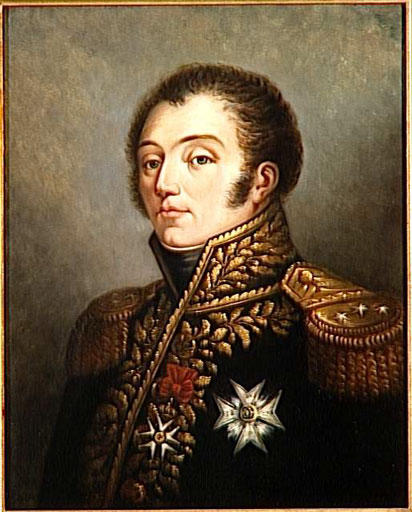
Jean-Pierre Firmin Malher was ordered to seize the Günzburg bridges.

After the debate at Wertingen, Mack gave up the idea of striking east along the south bank of the Danube. He instead decided to cross at Günzburg and march east on the north bank. At this time, Mack and Ferdinand deployed a significant part of their army on a line from Reisensburg, just east of Günzburg on the Danube, to Limbach which lies five kilometers to the southeast. General-major Konstantin Ghilian Karl d'Aspré commanded a force on the north bank designed to watch for the French and protect the bridges. Unknown to Mack, Ney's VI Corps received new instructions to seize a crossing at Günzburg. Ney sent off General of Division Jean-Pierre Firmin Malher's 3rd Division to capture the bridges. Malher's 8,000-man division included six battalions of the 27th, 50th, and 59th Line Infantry Regiments, three battalions of the 25th Light Infantry Regiment, and six artillery pieces. One of his brigade commanders was General of Brigade Mathieu Delabassé.

For the attack, Malher split his force into three columns. The western column under Colonel Étienne Nicolas Lefol moved to Leipheim but he abandoned the effort when the street led into a marsh (now the Badesee Günzburg and Mooswaldsee). (Note: The Badesee Günzburg and Mooswaldsee can be seen on Google Earth.) The central column led by General of Brigade Pierre-Louis Binet de Marcognet moved directly south toward the two main Günzburg bridges. Led by Delabassé, the 59th Regiment made up the eastern column which moved toward a bridge just east of the town. The bridge at Reisenburg was ignored.

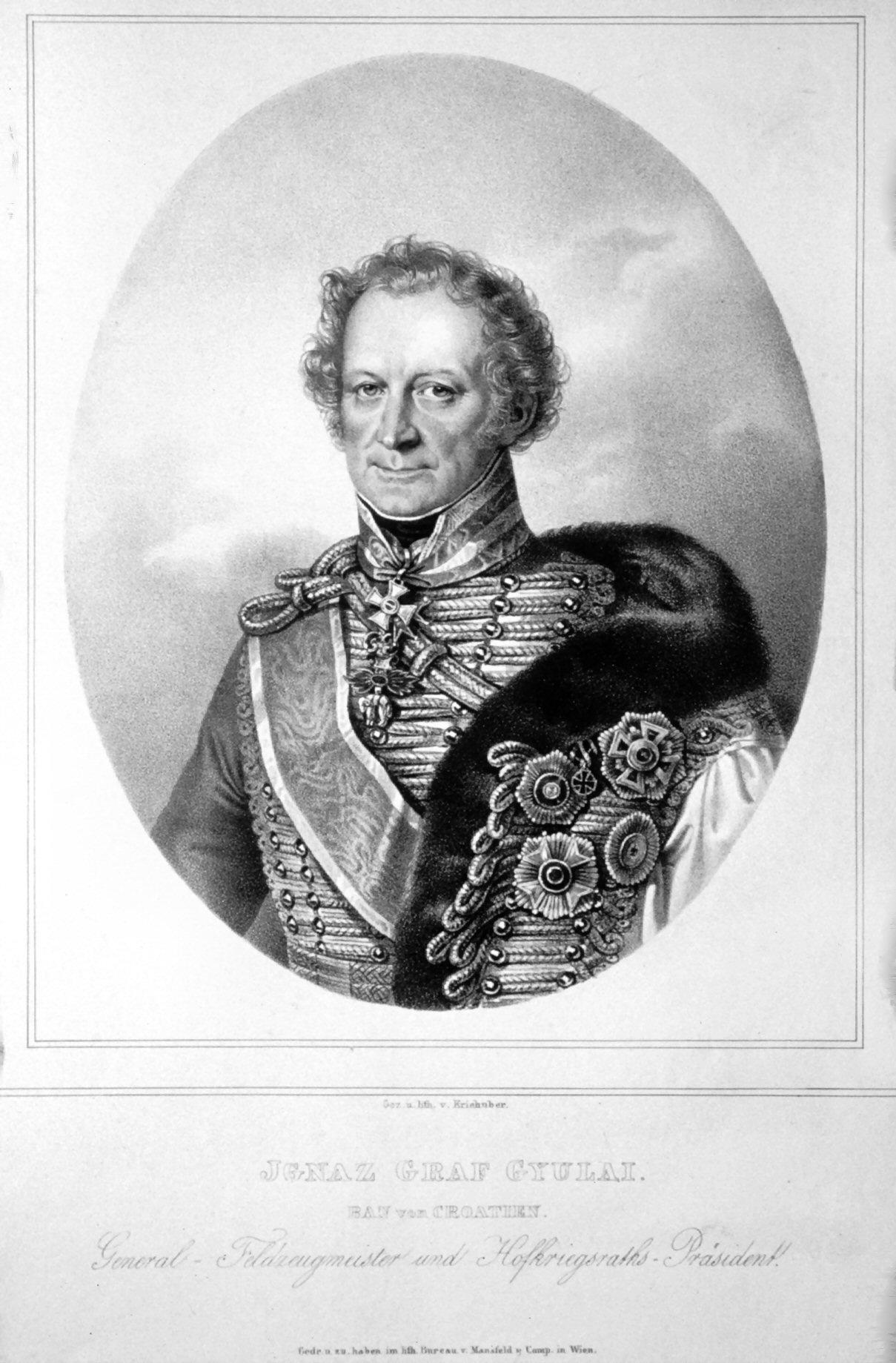
Ignaz Gyulai was ordered to rebuild the eastern bridge.

Marcognet's central column bumped into d'Aspré's picket line. Alerted, the Austrians in Günzburg immediately destroyed the bridges. Trapped between the French and the now-unbridged river, d'Aspré surrendered with 200 Tyrolean jägers and two cannons. Malher pressed on and attacked the town. Günzburg sits on high ground overlooking the Danube and an island in the stream. The island was crossed by two bridges. From the south bank, positions suitable for artillery dominate the low banks and the island. The soldiers of the Archduke Charles Infantry Regiment Nr. 3 and 20 cannons laid down a deadly curtain of fire. Malher brought forward four cannons, but they were overwhelmed by Austrian counter-battery fire. After a futile effort to rebuild the bridges under fire, the French gave up and took cover.

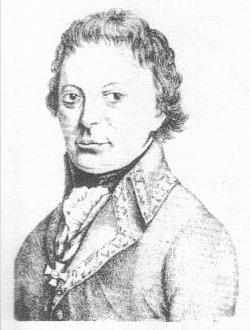
Konstantin Ghilian Karl d'Aspré was captured.

Despite the previous fighting, Mack persisted in his idea to cross to the north bank. Accordingly, he ordered Feldmarschall-Leutnant Ignaz Gyulai to take seven battalions and 14 squadrons to the eastern bridge. Mack directed Gyulai to repair the span, cross over, and form a bridgehead on the north bank. He intended that the army would cross to the north bank that night and operate there.

The 7,000-man Austrian force included four battalions of the Kaunitz Infantry Regiment Nr. 20, three battalions of the Württemberg Infantry Regiment Nr. 38, one battalion of the Franz Jellacic Infantry Regiment Nr. 62, one Jäger battalion, the Grenadier battalions of the Stuart, Colloredo, Erbach, and Kaunitz Infantry Regiments, four squadrons of the Archduke Palatine Hussar Regiment Nr. 12, two squadrons of the Rosenberg Chevau-léger Regiment Nr. 6, two squadrons of the Schwarzenberg Uhlan Regiment Nr. 2, and six artillery pieces.

No sooner had Gyulai's men repaired the bridge, then the 59th Regiment appeared, hours behind schedule. In close order column, the French smashed through the Austrian defenders and seized the span. Austrian cavalry appeared and charged the 59th three times but the French formed square and drove off each attack. Malher concentrated his division to defend his newly acquired river crossing. As night fell, the French controlled both ends of the span. Ney's other two divisions were also busy on 9 October. General of Division Louis Henri Loison's 2nd Division of VI Corps captured the bridge at Elchingen, defeating the single Austrian regiment defending it. General of Division Pierre Dupont de l'Etang's 1st Division advanced toward Ulm.

== Result ==
The Austrians lost six guns and 2,000 casualties including d'Aspré captured and Major Franz Muller of the Kaunitz Regiment killed. Their losses fell heavily on the Württemberg Regiment. The French suffered 700 casualties including Colonel Gérard Lacuée of the 59th killed. With crossings at Günzburg and Elchingen controlled by the French, Mack gave up his plan to cross at Günzburg and ordered the army to retreat to Ulm. Mack later excused his mistake in instructing Gyulai to rebuild the bridge. He claimed that he was so absorbed in writing orders on the 9th that he did not notice the cannon fire. Ney reported to Napoleon that both Mack and Ferdinand had been at Günzburg on the 9th and suggested that a strong enemy force lay at Ulm. However, after interviewing his prisoner d'Aspré, Ney concluded that the Austrians were retreating to Biberach. Napoleon then ordered Ney to attack Ulm, not understanding that he was sending a single corps against the entire Austrian army. The next action was the Battle of Haslach-Jungingen on 11 October.

== Notes ==
Footnotes

Citations

Preceded by Battle of Wertingen	Napoleonic Wars; Battle of Haslach-Jungingen	Succeeded by Battle of Elchingen
