= Ignác Gyulay =

Hungarian general & statesman (1763–1831)

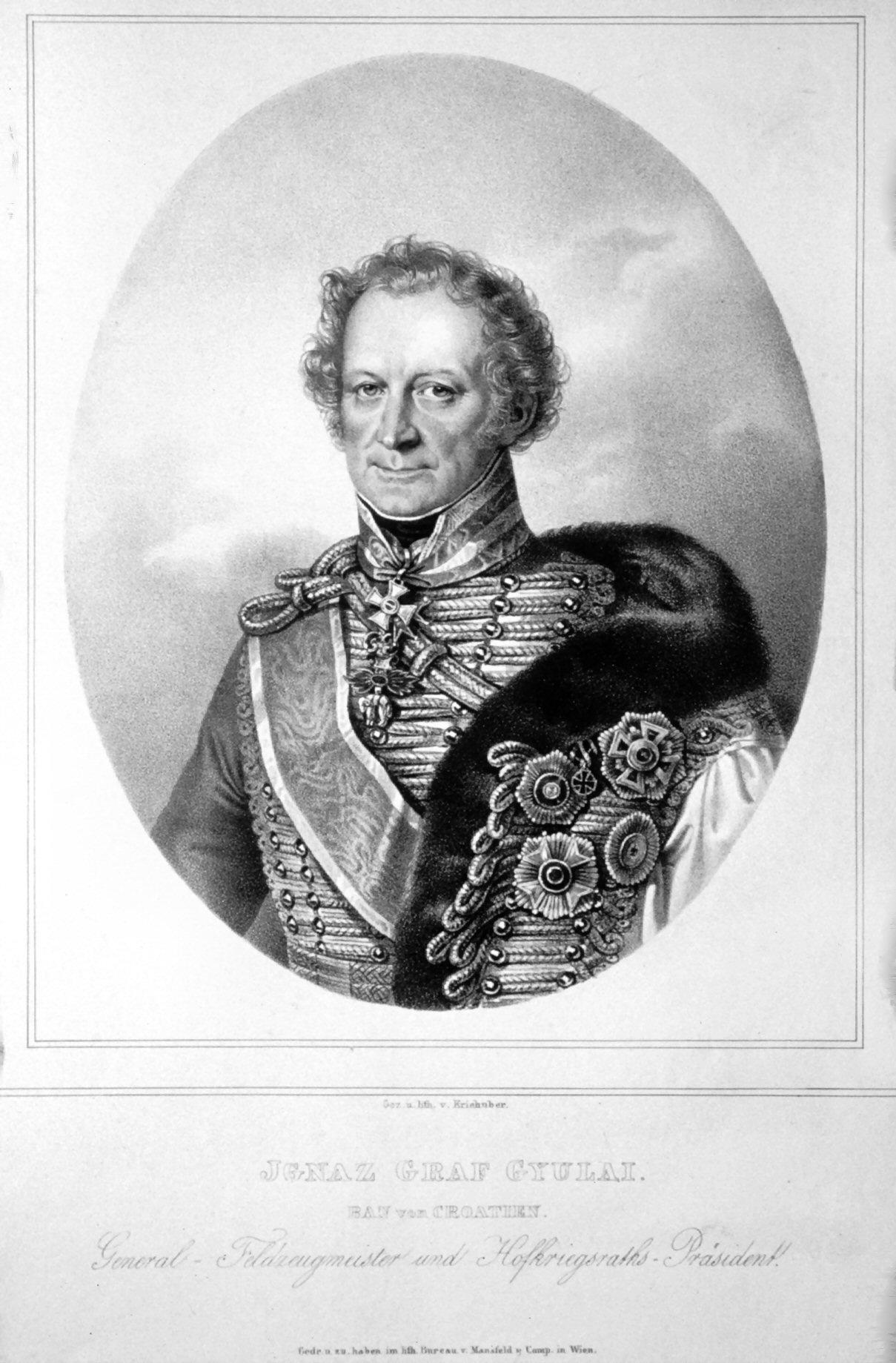
- Gyulay in 1830
- Born: 11 September 1763; Nagyszeben, Kingdom of Hungary (Sibiu, modern-day Romania)
- Died: 11 November 1831 (aged 68); Vienna
- Military career
- Allegiance: Austrian Empire
- Rank: Feldzeugmeister
- Conflicts: Austro-Turkish War (1788–1791); Storm of Cetin Castle; French Revolutionary Wars; First Battle of Wissembourg; Second Battle of Wissembourg; Action at Renchen; Action at Memmingen; Battle of Ostrach; First Battle of Stockach; Second Battle of Stockach; Battle of Messkirch; Battle of Ampfing; Battle of Hohenlinden; Napoleonic Wars; Ulm Campaign; Battle of Sacile; Battle of Piave River; Action at Graz; Battle of Dresden; Battle of Leipzig; Battle of La Rothière; Battle of Bar-sur-Aube; Battle of Arcis-sur-Aube; Battle of Paris
- Awards: Knight's Cross, Military Order of Maria Theresa (1794); Commander's Cross, Military Order of Maria Theresa (1800); Order of Leopold (1813); Order of St. Alexander Nevsky (1814); Order of the Red Eagle, 1st Cl. (1814); Military Order of Max Joseph (1814); Order of the Golden Fleece (1830); Order of Saint Stephen (1830)

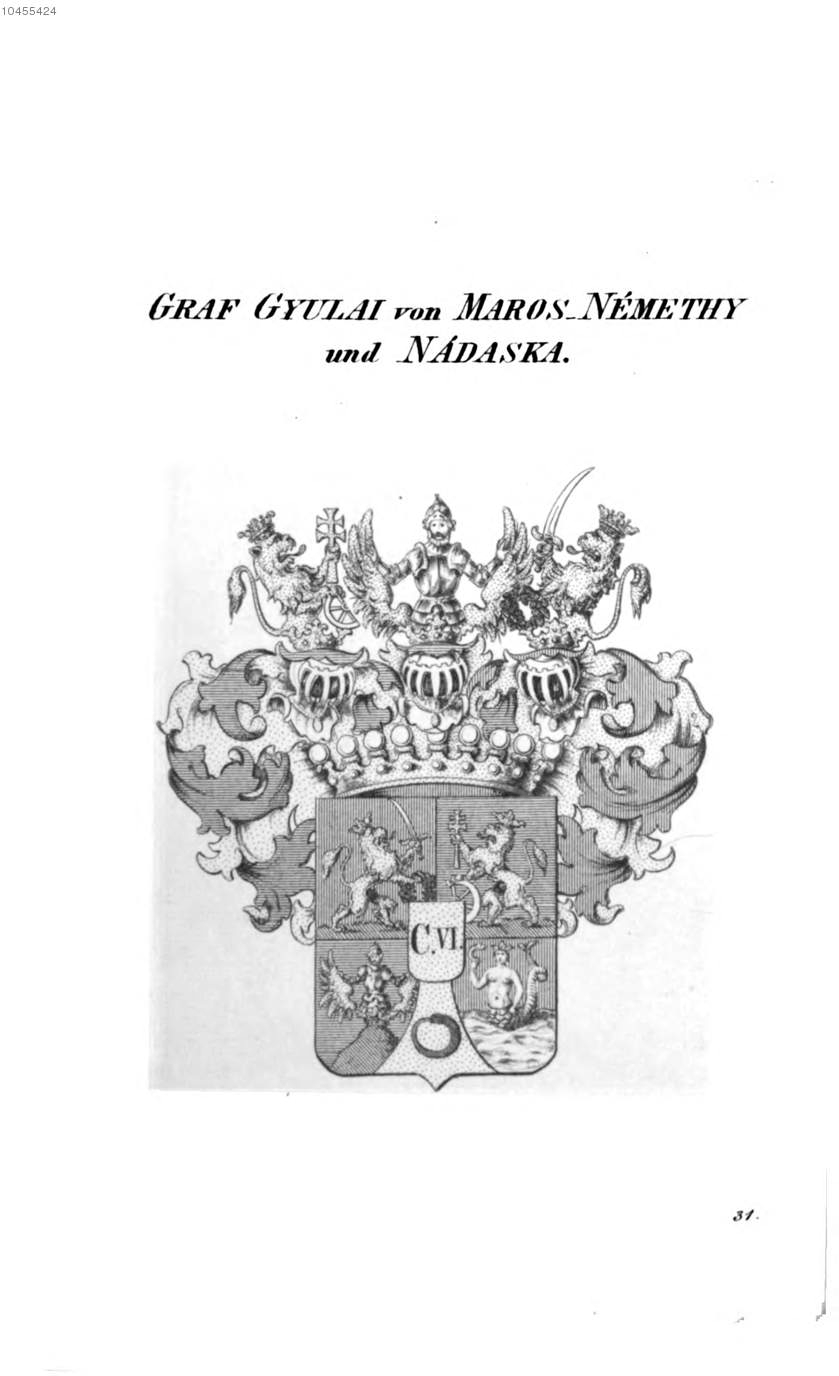
Arms of the Count Gyulay von Maros-Németh und Nádaska

Count Ignác Gyulay de Marosnémeti et Nádaska, Ignácz Gyulay, Ignaz Gyulai (11 September 1763 – 11 November 1831) was a Hungarian military officer, joined the army of the Habsburg monarchy, fought against Ottoman Turkey, and became a general officer during the French Revolutionary Wars. From 1806 he held the title of Ban of Croatia. In the struggle against the First French Empire during Napoleonic Wars, he commanded army corps. At the time of his death, he presided over the Hofkriegsrat, the Austrian Council of War.

While fighting against the Turks, Gyulay rose in rank to become a field officer. From 1793 to 1796, he served on the upper Rhine in combat with the armies of the French First Republic. In 1799 he led a brigade in Germany and the following year he commanded a division. From 1801 until 1831, he was Proprietor (Inhaber) of a Hungarian infantry regiment.

During the Napoleonic Wars, Gyulay fought in the 1805 campaign against the First French Empire and later served his emperor as a negotiator in the peace talks. He commanded an Austrian army corps in the 1809 campaign in Italy. Again leading a corps, he fought at the decisive Battle of the Nations in 1813. During the subsequent French campaign in 1814, he led one of the corps in the victorious Allied armies.

== Early career ==
Born in Nagyszeben (Hermannstadt) in the region of Transylvania in modern-day Sibiu, Romania on 11 September 1763, Gyulay was the oldest son of the Austrian Feldmarschallleutnant Count Sámuel Gyulay de Maros-Németh und Nádaska (1723–1802) and his wife, Baroness Anna Bornemisza de Kászon et Impérfalva (1734–1814).

In 1781, he joined his father's unit, the Gyulay Infantry Regiment # 32, as a Fähnrich (cadet). He fought in the Austro-Turkish War (1787–91), becoming a Major in the 2nd Banal Grenz Infantry Regiment # 70 on 25 March 1789. Within a year he earned promotion to Oberst-Leutnant and commanded a battalion of the Gyulay Freikorps. He led this unit in the storm of Cetin Castle on 20 July 1790.

== French Revolutionary Wars ==
=== War of the First Coalition ===
In 1793, the army assigned Gyulay to the Army of the Upper Rhine under the command of Dagobert von Wurmser. On 13 October that year, he led a brigade under Friedrich von Hotze in the First Battle of Wissembourg. In November, he held the village of Mertzwiller for three weeks in the face of French attacks during the Battle of Haguenau. This action earned him the Knight's Cross of the Military Order of Maria Theresa in 1794.

In 1793–94, his younger brother Albert Gyulay served in the Flanders Campaign. In 1794, Ignác Gyulay married Maria Freiin von Edelsheim (d. 1814). Their son Ferencz Gyulai was born in 1798 and went on to become a high-ranking Austro-Hungarian general.

Gyulay fought on the upper Rhine in 1794 and 1795. On 8 April 1795, he became Oberst (colonel) of the Benjowsky Infantry Regiment # 31. However, he continued to lead the Gyulay Freikorps. In 1796, he served under Michael von Fröhlich in Maximilian Baillet de Latour's Army of the Upper Rhine. He fought at Renchen on 28 June and helped cover the subsequent retreat of the Imperial troops. Archduke Charles ordered him to command a force linking the Army of the Upper Rhine and Fröhlich's corps. After the Battle of Ettlingen, Gyulay led Fröhlich's rearguard, earning praise from his superior as a skillful commander of outposts. Later that fall, he greatly distinguished himself in action at Memmingen. For eight hours on 22 September, he held up the advance 6,000 French with only 1,200 soldiers. On 16 May 1797 he was elevated in rank to General-Major.

=== War of the Second Coalition ===
On 20–21 March 1799, Gyulay led a brigade in Friedrich Nauendorf's division at the Battle of Ostrach. He also fought at the First Battle of Stockach on 25 March. Soon afterward, he ambushed three battalions and four squadrons of French troops and chased them into Breisach.

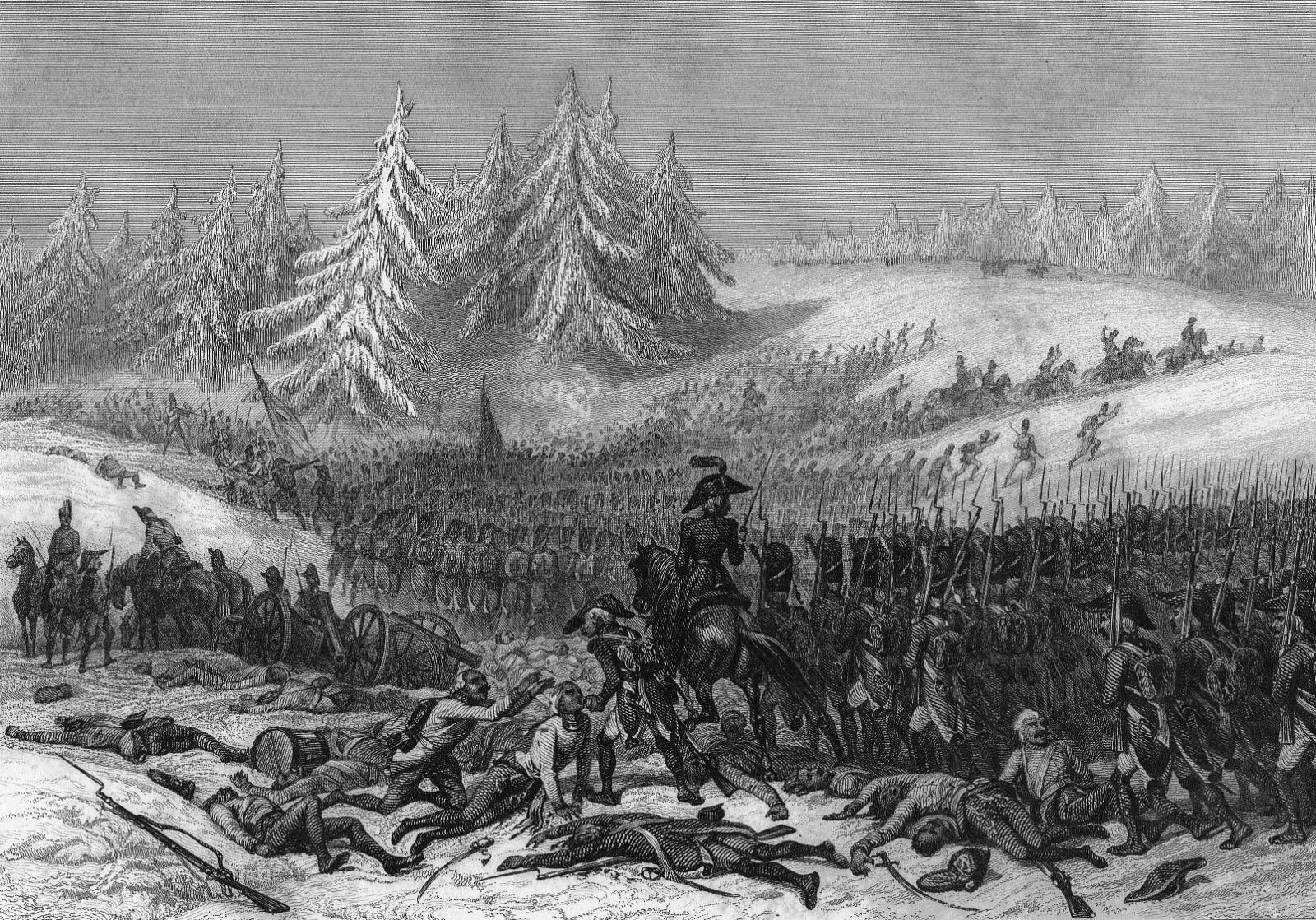
Battle of Hohenlinden

The following year, Gyulay fought at the Second Battle of Stockach on 3 May 1800 and the Battle of Messkirch on 5 May. After the latter action, he led the rearguard and won a skirmish at Günzburg on 24 May, taking 250 French prisoners. He captured 156 enemy troops in another skirmish at Krumbach on 11 June. These successes led to Gyulay being awarded the Commander's Cross of the Military Order of Maria Theresa and promoted to Feldmarschallleutnant on 29 October.

When the truce ended that fall, Gyulay found himself leading a division in Johann Riesch's corps, which was part of Archduke John's main army. He fought at the Battle of Ampfing on 1 December. Two days later at the Battle of Hohenlinden, Antoine Richepanse's division marched in front of Riesch's slow-moving left column to envelop the Austrian left-center column. Instead of attacking with crushing strength, Riesch erred by breaking up his two divisions into five small task forces while retaining three battalions and 17 squadrons in reserve. The corps commander then sent each task force along separate forest trails to attack the French. Gyulay fought well, but he had too few troops under his orders to influence the outcome of the battle, which ended in a decisive French victory.

In April 1801, he became the proprietor of Ignác Gyulay Infantry Regiment # 60, a Hungarian unit formed in 1798. He held this post for 30 years until his death.

== Napoleonic Wars ==
=== War of the Third Coalition ===
In 1805, Gyulay fought in the Ulm Campaign, commanding the Danube army's grenadier reserve in Franz von Werneck's corps. At the Battle of Günzburg on 9 October he commanded a division of seven battalions and 14 squadrons. Ordered to rebuild a bridge across the Danube, he did so but was surprised when a French infantry regiment suddenly appeared and seized the span. Later, he escaped from Ulm with Archduke Ferdinand Karl Joseph of Austria-Este and others. On 4 November, Gyulai served on a council of war convened by Emperor Francis II to determine how to save Vienna. Soon afterward, the emperor ordered him to negotiate secretly with Emperor Napoleon I of France.

On 25 November, Gyulay accompanied Johann Philipp Stadion, Count von Warthausen on a mission to negotiate a treaty with Emperor Napoleon I of France. During the talks Gyulay demanded that France compensate Austria for the loss of Venetia. A frustrated Napoleon wrote to Charles Maurice de Talleyrand-Périgord that Gyulay, "talked to me of the Teutonic Order, of the Diet in Ratisbonne, and I don't know what else". Though the discussions continued with Talleyrand, Napoleon became more focused on defeating his enemies and nothing came out of the peace talks. After the disaster at the Battle of Austerlitz, at which Gyulay was not present, he and Johann I Josef, Prince of Liechtenstein negotiated the Peace of Pressburg with the First French Empire. Emperor Francis II appointed Gyulay the Ban of Croatia in 1806, a position he held throughout his lifetime.

=== War of the Fifth Coalition ===
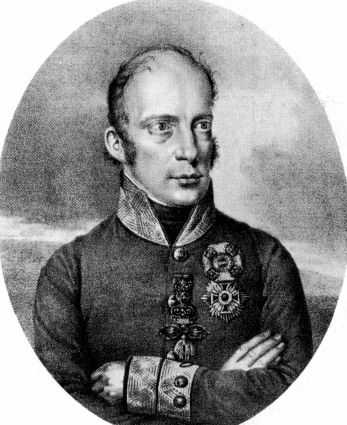
Archduke John

At the outset of the War of the Fifth Coalition, Gyulay led the IX Armeekorps in Archduke John's army in Italy. As originally organized, the corps consisted of three divisions under Franz Gorup von Bessanez, Christian Wolfskehl von Reichenberg, and Vinko Knežević. Gyulay commanded 22,290 infantry, 2,400 cavalry, and 86 artillery pieces. The IX Armeekorps fought at the Battle of Sacile on 16 April 1809. During the fighting, the surprise intervention of the IX Armeekorps on the right flank was important in securing the Austrian victory over the Franco-Italian army of Eugène de Beauharnais. His brother Albert led VIII Armeekorps in the same battle.

When Emperor Napoleon defeated Archduke Charles at the Battle of Eckmühl on the Danube, Archduke John was thrown on the defensive. The archduke assigned elements of Gyulay's corps to defend Dalmatia and other places. At the Battle of the Piave on 8 May, Gyulay led a considerably reduced IX Armeekorps of 12,720 men. As at Sacile, his brother Albert Gyulay led the VIII Armeekorps. Later, he defended Kranj in Carniola with 14,880 soldiers. After Eugène's army passed to the east in pursuit of Archduke John's army, Gyulay operated against Graz. On 25 June, his 22,000 troops attacked Jean-Baptiste Broussier's division which was besieging Graz. Broussier retreated into the hills and successfully defended himself until the arrival of Auguste Marmont's corps on the 27th. Gyulay was able to reprovision the Graz garrison before he withdrew. In the fighting, many of the hastily raised Austrian Landwehr and Hungarian insurrections militia fled the field. However, Gyulay's Austrian line infantry fought hard and suffered 164 dead and 816 wounded and captured. Reports of French casualties range from 263 to 900.

=== War of the Sixth Coalition ===
When Austria entered the War of the Sixth Coalition, Gyulay was appointed commander of the Left Wing. His forces included the infantry divisions of Nikolaus Weissenwolf and Alois Liechtenstein, plus the mixed infantry-cavalry division of Louis Charles Folliot de Crenneville. This organization fought at the Battle of Dresden on 26–27 August 1813, where it fought on the left flank and suffered serious losses.

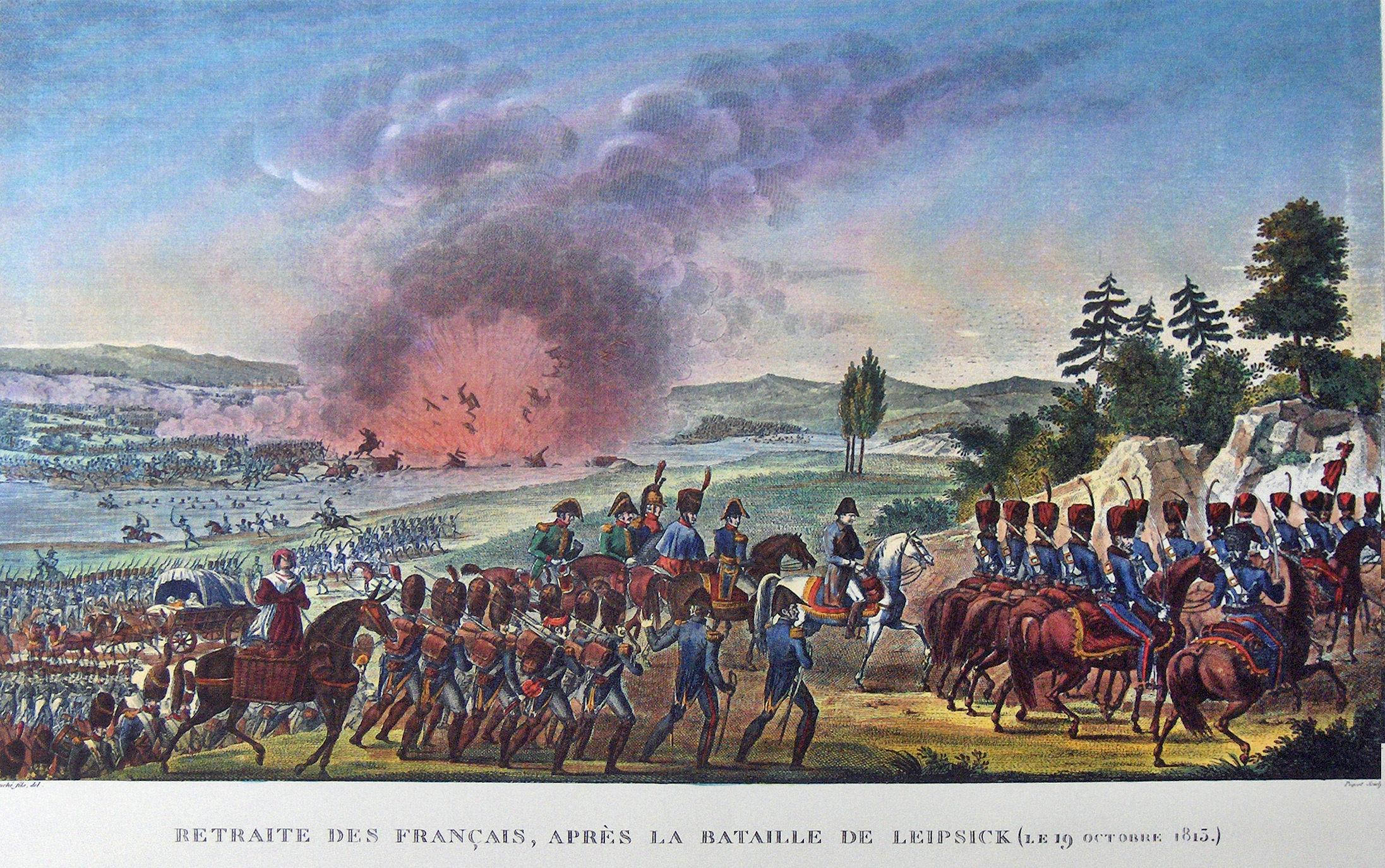
Napoleon retreats after being defeated at the Battle of Leipzig.

After a reorganization, Gyulay's formation became known as III Armeekorps, with each infantry division consisting of two, rather than three brigades. The new division commanders were Crenneville, Albrecht Murray de Melgum, and Prince Philipp of Hessen-Homburg. This was the organization used at the Battle of Leipzig on 16–19 October. Before the battle, Gyulay's corps reached a position to the west of Napoleon's Grand Army, potentially cutting off the retreat of the French and their allies. On the 16th, he attacked the suburb of Lindenau and had success at first, forcing Marshal Michel Ney to divert Henri Gatien Bertrand's IV Corps to hold the position. Without this important reinforcement, Napoleon's attacks on the main Austro-Russian army failed. On the 18th, Bertrand drove Gyulay away from Lindenau, clearing the way for Napoleon's retreat.

Gyulay continued to lead the III Armeekorps in the 1814 campaign. He fought at the Battle of La Rothière on 1 February and defeated the French at the Battle of Bar-sur-Aube on 27 February. On 20–21 March, he led his corps in action at the Battle of Arcis-sur-Aube. He participated in the Battle of Paris when the Allied armies captured the French capital, compelling Napoleon to abdicate in the Treaty of Fontainebleau on 11 April. He received numerous awards, including the Austrian Order of Leopold and the Military Honor Cross, the Russian Order of St. Alexander Nevsky, the Prussian Order of the Red Eagle - 1st Class, and the Bavarian Military Order of Max Joseph.

== Later career ==
From 1814 to 1823, Gyulay commanded the Banal Military Border with Turkey. He became proprietor of the 1st Banal Grenz Regiment # 10 and the 2nd Banal Grenz Regiment # 11 in 1823, and held these titles for the rest of his life. He was made a Knight of the Order of the Golden Fleece and received the Order of Saint Stephen of Hungary, both in 1830. He briefly sat as president of the Hofkriegsrat (Aulic Council) from 7 October 1830 until his death on 11 November 1831 in Vienna.

== Footnotes ==
Military offices
Preceded by Prince Friedrich Franz Xaver of Hohenzollern-Hechingen	President of the Hofkriegsrat; 1830–1831	Succeeded by Johann Maria Philipp Frimont
Preceded by Vacant (1798–1801)	Proprietor (Inhaber) of Infantry Regiment # 60; 1801–1831	Unknown
Political offices
Preceded by Ivan Erdödy	Ban of Croatia; 1806–1831	Succeeded by Franjo Vlašić
