= Reserve Cavalry Corps (Grande Armée) =

- Active: 1805–1807
- Country: First French Empire
- Branch: French Imperial Army
- Type: Shock cavalry
- Size: Corps
- Engagements: War of the Third Coalition; War of the Fourth Coalition

Commanders
- Notable commanders: Jean-Baptiste Bessières; Joachim Murat

The Reserve Cavalry Corps or Cavalry Reserve of the Grande Armée was a French military unit that existed during the Napoleonic Wars. In 1805, Emperor Napoleon Bonaparte appointed Marshal Joachim Murat to command all the cavalry divisions that were not directly attached to the army corps. During the Ulm campaign, Murat led his horsemen in successfully hunting down many Austrian units that escaped the capitulation of Ulm, before fighting at Austerlitz in December 1805. Under Murat, the Cavalry Reserve played a prominent role in the destruction of the Prussian armies after the Battle of Jena-Auerstedt in 1806. In 1812, the Reserve Cavalry Corps was split up into the I, II, III, and IV Cavalry Corps for the French invasion of Russia.

== History ==
=== 1805 ===
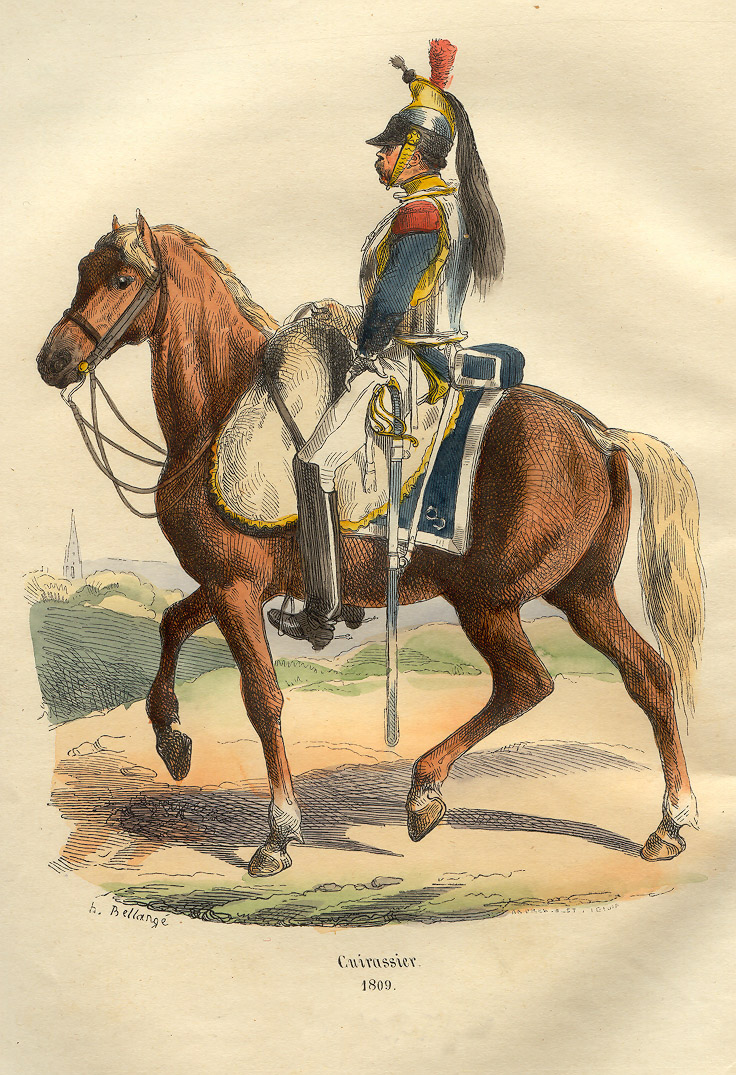
French cuirassier in 1809

At its formation, the Grande Armée comprised seven army corps, the Imperial Guard, the artillery reserve, and the Cavalry Reserve. The latter consisted of two cuirassier, one light cavalry, and five dragoon divisions, including one dismounted. The mass of 22,000 cavalrymen was supported by 24 pieces of artillery, while the remainder of the army's cavalry was distributed among the army corps in brigades or divisions. Napoleon appointed Marshal Joachim Murat to command the Reserve Cavalry. Generals Étienne Marie Antoine Champion de Nansouty and Jean-Joseph Ange d'Hautpoul led the cuirassier divisions while Generals Louis Klein, Frédéric Henri Walther, Marc Antoine de Beaumont, and François Antoine Louis Bourcier headed the dragoon divisions and General Louis Baraguey d'Hilliers commanded the dismounted unit. On 8 October 1805, at the Battle of Wertingen, Murat and Marshal Jean Lannes attacked an isolated Austrian division under General Franz Xaver von Auffenberg. Murat's horsemen included Klein's 3,000-strong dragoon division, Beaumont's 2,400-man dragoon division, and light cavalry brigades under Generals Antoine Lasalle and Anne-François-Charles Trelliard. With the support of some V Corps infantry, Murat's horsemen rode down the helpless Austrians, inflicting losses of 400 killed and wounded, 2,900 prisoners, six guns, and six flags. The French admitted 174 casualties.

The cavalry saw much service during the rest of the Ulm campaign. At the Battle of Haslach-Jungingen on 11 October 1805, the 15th and 17th Dragoon Regiments lost their eagles. However, the action was a French victory over a greatly superior force. Murat led his horsemen in a series of actions between 16 and 18 October before securing the surrender of General Franz von Werneck's Austrian corps. In these clashes, Klein's 1st, 2nd, 4th, 14th, 20th, and 26th Dragoon Regiments, the 1st Cuirassier Regiment, and other units were involved. At the Battle of Schöngrabern on 16 November, Klein's troopers were engaged as were the 11th, 13th, and 22nd Dragoons from Walther's division. At the Battle of Austerlitz on 2 December, Murat led approximately 7,400 cavalrymen including Nansouty's 1st Heavy Cavalry Division, Hautpoul's 2nd Heavy Cavalry Division, Walther's 2nd Dragoon Division, General François Étienne de Kellermann's light cavalry division and General Édouard Jean Baptiste Milhaud's light cavalry brigade. Beaumont's 3rd Dragoon Division was attached to the IV Corps while Bourcier's 4th Dragoon Division with 2,500 men and three guns were attached to the III Corps.

=== 1806–1807 ===
At the beginning of the War of the Fourth Coalition, the Reserve Corps under Murat included the 1st and 2nd Cuirassier Divisions, still commanded by Nansouty and d'Hautpoul, the 1st, 2nd, 3rd, and 4th Dragoon Divisions under Klein, General Emmanuel de Grouchy, Beaumont, and General Louis Michel Antoine Sahuc respectively, and a light cavalry division led by Lasalle. The pursuit that occurred after the French victory in the Battle of Jena-Auerstedt on 14 October has been described as classic. On the 16th, Murat and his cavalry accepted the surrender of Erfurt where 9,000–14,000 Prussians were made prisoners. At the Battle of Prenzlau on 28 October, Murat bluffed 10,000 Prussians with 64 guns into surrendering. The next day, 4,000 Prussians surrendered to Milhaud's troopers in the capitulation of Pasewalk. Also on 29 October, Lasalle's light cavalry captured a fortress manned by 5,000 men in the capitulation of Stettin.

On 16 December 1806, the Reserve Corps was split into the I Cavalry Corps under Murat and the II Cavalry Corps under Marshal Jean-Baptiste Bessières. The II Corps operated with the northern wing of the French corps that advanced across the Vistula. The II Corps consisted of the divisions of d'Hautpoul, Grouchy, and Sahuc, plus a light cavalry division under General Jacques Louis François Delaistre de Tilly. The II Corps was disbanded on 12 January 1807 and the Reserve Cavalry Corps was reconstituted. During the winter campaign, the 5th Dragoon Division was formed and assigned to General Nicolas Léonard Beker. It served near Warsaw under Marshal André Masséna. At the Battle of Eylau on 8 February 1807, Murat led a grand charge of 80 squadrons of cavalry, altogether 10,700 horsemen. The divisions of Grouchy, d'Hautpoul, Klein, and Milhaud were all engaged. The French cavalry suffered 1,500 casualties but they badly disrupted the Russian lines at a critical point in the battle. D'Hautpoul was killed in the struggle.

=== 1812 ===
In 1812, the Reserve Cavalry Corps was split up into the I, II, III, and IV Cavalry Corps for the invasion of Russia. Each corps consisted of two heavy cavalry divisions and one light cavalry division, except the IV which had one heavy and one light cavalry division. Nansouty led the I, General Louis-Pierre Montbrun the II, Grouchy the III, and La Tour-Maubourg the IV Cavalry Corps.

== Order of battle ==
=== Prussia, 1806 ===
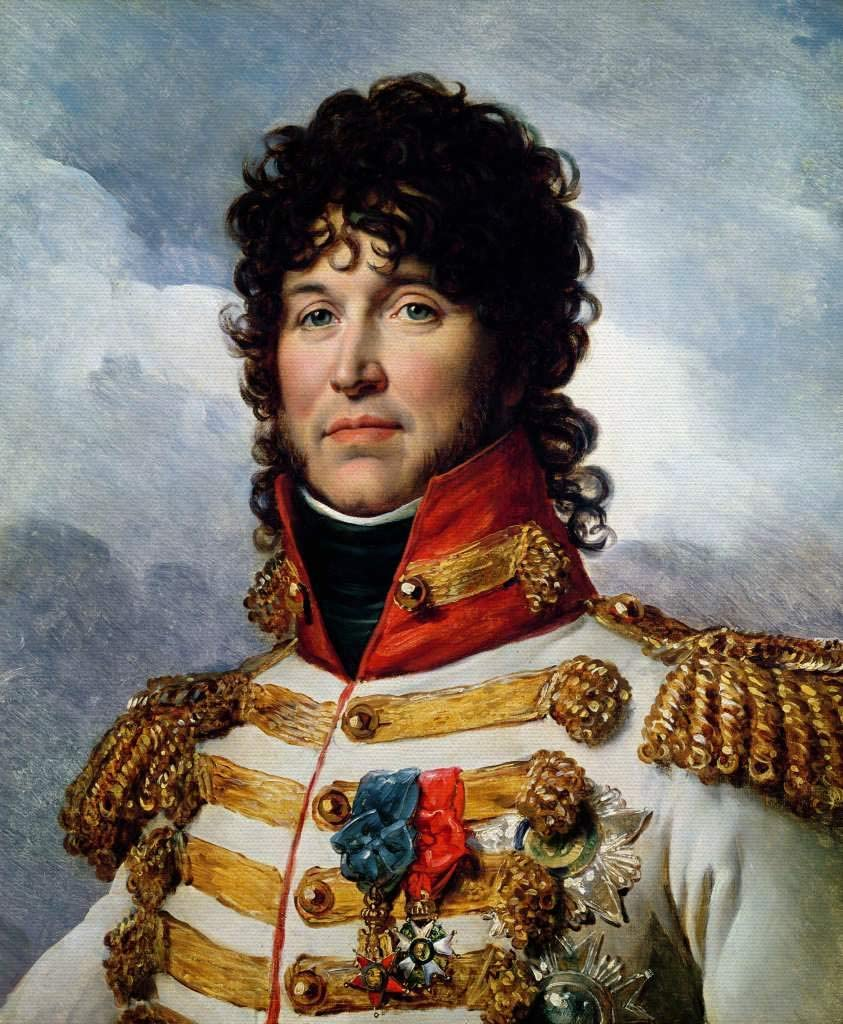
Joachim Murat

Reserve Cavalry Corps: Marshal Joachim Murat (19,629, 26 guns)

- Chief of Staff: General of Brigade Augustin Daniel Belliard
- 1st Cuirassier Division: General of Division Étienne Marie Antoine Champion de Nansouty (2,987, 3 guns)
  - Brigade: General of Brigade Jean-Marie Defrance
    - 1st Carabinier Regiment, 1st, 2nd, 3rd, and 4th squadrons
    - 2nd Carabinier Regiment, 1st, 2nd, 3rd, and 4th squadrons
  - Brigade: General of Brigade Armand Lebrun de La Houssaye
    - 2nd Cuirassier Regiment, 1st, 2nd, 3rd, and 4th squadrons
    - 9th Cuirassier Regiment, 1st, 2nd, 3rd, and 4th squadrons
  - Brigade: General of Brigade Antoine-Louis Decrest de Saint-Germain
    - 3rd Cuirassier Regiment, 1st, 2nd, 3rd, and 4th squadrons
    - 12th Cuirassier Regiment, 1st, 2nd, 3rd, and 4th squadrons
  - Artillery: 2nd Horse Artillery, 4th company (-), two 6-pound guns, one 6-inch howitzer
- 2nd Cuirassier Division: General of Division Jean-Joseph Ange d'Hautpoul (1,927, 3 guns)
  - Brigade: General of Brigade Jean Christophe Collin Verdière †
    - 1st Cuirassier Regiment, 1st, 2nd, 3rd, and 4th squadrons
    - 5th Cuirassier Regiment, 1st, 2nd, 3rd, and 4th squadrons
  - Brigade: General of Brigade Raymond-Gaspard de Bonardi de Saint-Sulpice
    - 10th Cuirassier Regiment, 1st, 2nd, 3rd, and 4th squadrons
  - Artillery: 2nd Horse Artillery, 4th company (-), two 6-pound guns, one 6-inch howitzer

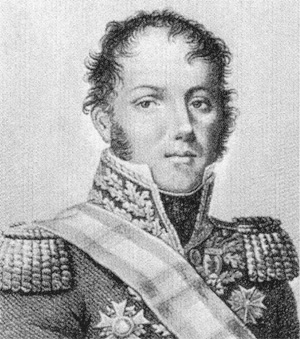
Louis Klein

- 1st Dragoon Division: General of Division Louis Klein (2,401, 3 guns)
  - Brigade: General of Brigade Jacques Étienne de Fornier Fénerolz
    - 1st Dragoon Regiment, 1st, 2nd, and 3rd squadrons
    - 2nd Dragoon Regiment, 1st, 2nd, and 3rd squadrons
  - Brigade: General of Brigade Auguste Étienne Lamotte
    - 4th Dragoon Regiment, 1st, 2nd, 3rd, and 4th squadrons
    - 14th Dragoon Regiment, 1st, 2nd, 3rd, and 4th squadrons
  - Brigade: General of Brigade Joseph Denis Picard
    - 20th Dragoon Regiment, 1st, 2nd, and 3rd squadrons
    - 26th Dragoon Regiment, 1st, 2nd, and 3rd squadrons
  - Artillery: 2nd Horse Artillery, 2nd company (-), two 8-pound guns, one 6-inch howitzer
- 2nd Dragoon Division: General of Division Emmanuel de Grouchy (2,915, 3 guns)
  - Brigade: General of Brigade Dominique Mansuy Roget
    - 3rd Dragoon Regiment, 1st, 2nd, and 3rd squadrons
    - 6th Dragoon Regiment, 1st, 2nd, and 3rd squadrons
  - Brigade: General of Brigade Jacques Louis François Milet
    - 10th Dragoon Regiment, 1st, 2nd, and 3rd squadrons
    - 11th Dragoon Regiment, 1st, 2nd, and 3rd squadrons
  - Brigade: General of Brigade André Joseph Boussart
    - 13th Dragoon Regiment, 1st, 2nd, and 3rd squadrons
    - 22nd Dragoon Regiment, 1st, 2nd, and 3rd squadrons
  - Artillery: 2nd Horse Artillery, 2nd company (-), two 8-pound guns, one 6-inch howitzer
- 3rd Dragoon Division: General of Division Marc Antoine de Beaumont (3,055, 3 guns)
  - Brigade: General of Brigade Charles Joseph Boyé
    - 5th Dragoon Regiment, 1st, 2nd, 3rd, and 4th squadrons
    - 8th Dragoon Regiment, 1st, 2nd, 3rd, and 4th squadrons
  - Brigade: General of Brigade Frédéric Christophe Marizy
    - 12th Dragoon Regiment, 1st, 2nd, 3rd, and 4th squadrons
    - 16th Dragoon Regiment, 1st, 2nd, 3rd, and 4th squadrons
  - Brigade: General of Brigade Victor de Fay de La Tour-Maubourg
    - 9th Dragoon Regiment, 1st, 2nd, 3rd, and 4th squadrons
    - 21st Dragoon Regiment, 1st, 2nd, 3rd, and 4th squadrons
  - Artillery: 2nd Horse Artillery, 3rd company (-), two 8-pound guns, one 6-inch howitzer

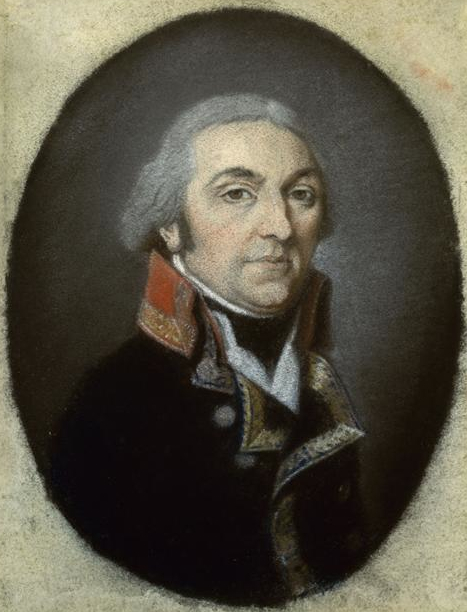
Louis Sahuc

- 4th Dragoon Division: General of Division Louis Michel Antoine Sahuc (3,129, 3 guns)
  - Brigade: General of Brigade Pierre Margaron
    - 17th Dragoon Regiment, 1st, 2nd, and 3rd squadrons
    - 27th Dragoon Regiment, 1st, 2nd, and 3rd squadrons
  - Brigade: General of Brigade Jean-Baptiste Antoine Laplanche
    - 18th Dragoon Regiment, 1st, 2nd, and 3rd squadrons
    - 19th Dragoon Regiment, 1st, 2nd, and 3rd squadrons
  - Brigade: unknown commander
    - 15th Dragoon Regiment, 1st, 2nd, and 3rd squadrons
    - 25th Dragoon Regiment, 1st, 2nd, and 3rd squadrons
  - Artillery: 6th Horse Artillery, 4th company (-), two 8-pound guns, one 6-inch howitzer
- Light Cavalry Division: General of Brigade Antoine Lasalle
  - Light Cavalry Brigade: General of Brigade Lasalle
    - 5th Hussar Regiment, 1st, 2nd, and 3rd squadrons
    - 7th Hussar Regiment, 1st, 2nd, and 3rd squadrons
  - Light Cavalry Brigade: General of Brigade Édouard Jean Baptiste Milhaud
    - 1st Hussar Regiment, 1st, 2nd, and 3rd squadrons
    - 13th Chasseurs-à-Cheval Regiment, 1st, 2nd, and 3rd squadrons
