= Battle of Donauwörth =

1805 battle during the War of the Third Coalition

- Part of the Ulm campaign within the War of the Third Coalition
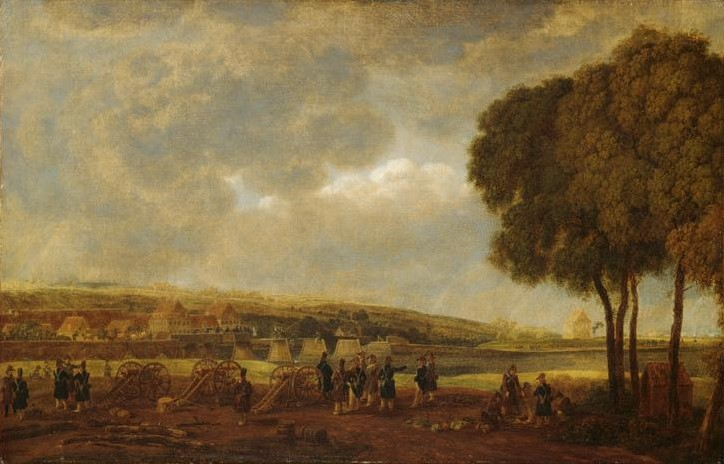
- Crossing of the Danube near Donauwörth by Wilhelm von Kobell, 1807
Date	7 October 1805
Location	Donauwörth, Electorate of Bavaria, Holy Roman Empire 48.6964°N 10.8001°E
Result	French victory

Belligerents
First French Empire	Austrian Empire

Commanders and leaders
Joachim Murat; Jean-de-Dieu Soult	Michael von Kienmayer

War of the Third Coalition:
Ulm Campaign
current battle
Napoleon in command
Napoleon not in command

The Battle of Donauwörth was the first engagement of Napoleon's 1805 Austrian campaign. French forces under marshals Joachim Murat and Nicolas Soult beat an Austrian army corps under Kienmayer on 7 October at Donauwörth and crossed the Danube.

== Course ==
After Austrian forces under general Karl Mack entered Bavaria, the French army left the camp de Boulogne and reached the Rhine at the end of September 1805. The Austrian general based his army around the Bavarian town of Ulm beside the Danube, ready to meet the French force when it exited the Black Forest.

Napoleon I sent the general cavalry reserve under the command of Joachim Murat to establish supply depots and raid the countryside in an attempt to trick Mack while Napoleon himself took his main force on a vast enveloping movement to the north. On 7 October Napoleon, Murat and Soult's 4th Corps arrived before Donauworth, 65 km downstream of Ulm. The town was defended by Michael von Kienmayer's force, which formed the rearguard of the Austrian army. The battle pitted Soult's corps (mainly Dominique-Joseph René Vandamme's division) and Murat's cavalry against the Austrian force.

The French victory enabled an initial crossing of the Danube and allowed the Grande Armée to deploy on the river's right bank as well as continuing its enveloping manoeuvre. Fighting resumed the following day at Wertingen.
