= Ulm campaign =

1805 campaign during the War of the Third Coalition

- Part of the War of the Third Coalition
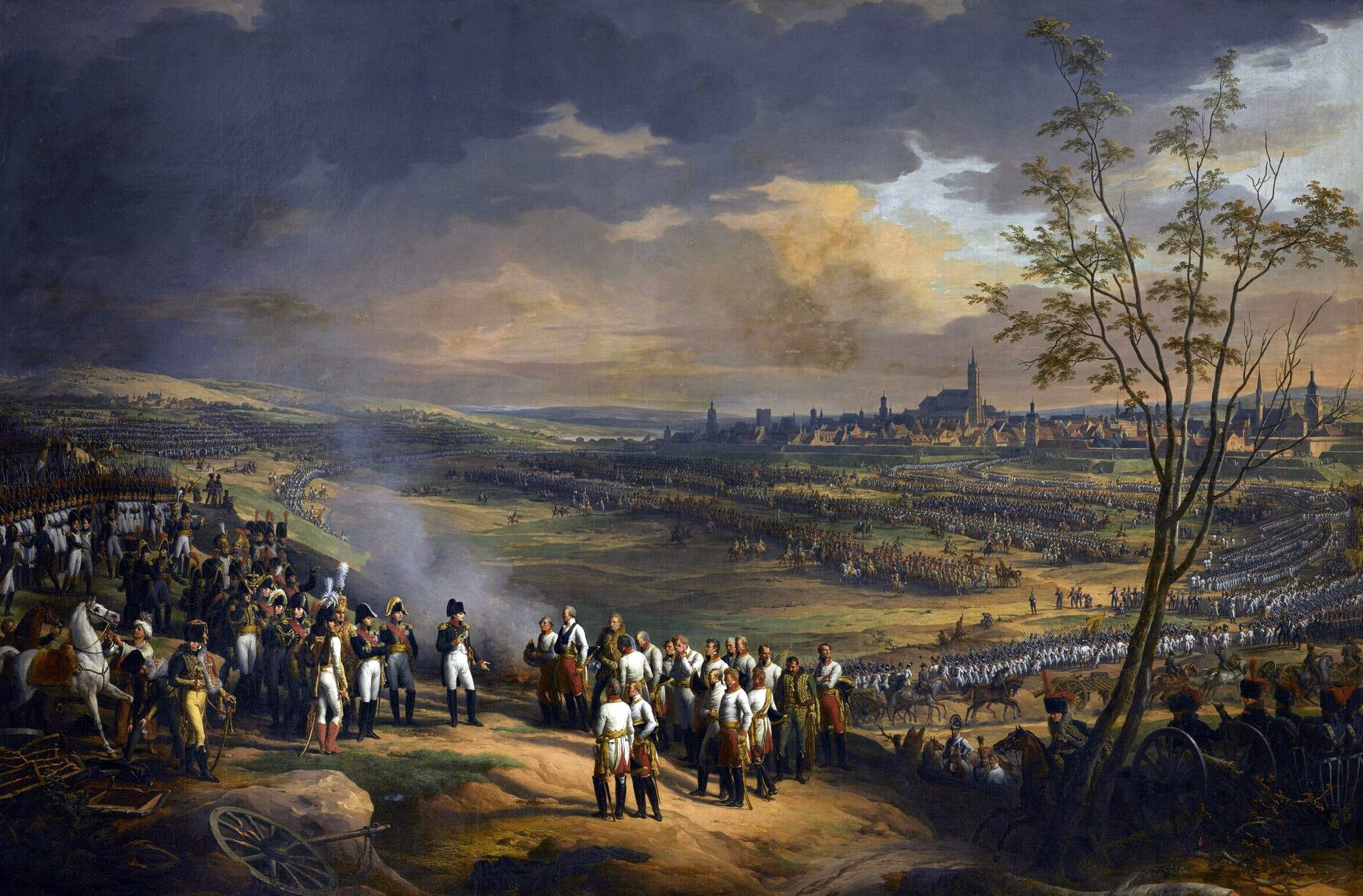
- The Capitulation of Ulm; Charles Thévenin, 1850
Date	25 September – 20 October 1805
Location	Central Europe
Result	French victory

Belligerents
France; Bavaria	Austria

Commanders and leaders
Napoleon; Pierre Augereau; Jean-Baptiste Bernadotte; Jean-Baptiste Bessières; Louis-Nicolas Davout; Jean Lannes; Auguste de Marmont; Édouard Mortier; Joachim Murat; Michel Ney; Jean-de-Dieu Soult; Bernhard Deroy	Archduke Ferdinand; Karl Mack (surrendered) (POW); Franjo Jelačić; Michael von Kienmayer; Johann von Riesch (surrendered); Prince of Schwarzenberg; Franz von Werneck (surrendered)

Strength
165,200–235,000	74,000

Casualties and losses
6,000	10,000 killed or wounded 60,000 captured

War of the Third Coalition:
Ulm Campaign
Napoleon in command
Napoleon not in command

The Ulm campaign was a series of French and Bavarian military maneuvers and battles to outflank and capture an Austrian army in 1805 during the War of the Third Coalition. It took place in the vicinity of and inside the Swabian city of Ulm. The French Grande Armée, led by Emperor Napoleon, had 210,000 troops organized into seven corps and hoped to knock out the Austrian army in the Danube before Russian reinforcements could arrive. Rapid marching let Napoleon conduct a large wheeling maneuver, which captured an Austrian army of 60,000 under Feldmarschall-Leutnant (FML) Karl Freiherr Mack von Leiberich on 20 October at Ulm. The campaign is by some military historians regarded as a strategic masterpiece and was influential in the development of the Schlieffen Plan in the late 19th century. Napoleon himself wrote:

four months of marching about, months of fatigue and wretchedness, have proved to me that nothing is more hideous, more miserable, than war. And yet our sufferings in the Guard are not to be compared with those of the line.

The victory at Ulm did not end the war since a large Russian army under Mikhail Kutuzov was near Vienna to defend the city against the French. The Russians withdrew to the northeast to await reinforcements and to link up with Austrian army units. The French moved aggressively forward and captured Vienna on 12 November. On 2 December, the massive Battle of Austerlitz, causing 24,000 to 36,000 casualties, removed Austria from the war. The resulting Treaty of Pressburg in late December brought the Third Coalition to an end and established Napoleonic France as the major power in Central Europe, which led to the War of the Fourth Coalition against the Kingdom of Prussia and Russia the following year.

== Background ==
Europe had been by then embroiled in the French Revolutionary Wars since 1792. After five years of war, the French Republic subdued the First Coalition in 1797. A Second Coalition was formed in 1798 but this too was defeated by 1801. Britain remained the only opponent for the new French Consulate. In March 1802, France and Britain agreed to end hostilities under the Treaty of Amiens. For the first time in ten years, all of Europe was at peace. There were many problems between the two sides and implementing the agreements that had been reached at Amiens seemed to be a growing challenge. Leading British officials resented having to return colonies captured from the French and Dutch, while Napoleon was angered that Britain refused to evacuate Malta as stipulated in the treaty. The tense situation only worsened since Napoleon sent an expeditionary force to retake control of Saint-Domingue from Toussaint Louverture. In May 1803, Britain declared war on France.

=== Third Coalition ===
In December 1804, an Anglo-Swedish agreement led to the creation of the Third Coalition. British Prime Minister William Pitt the Younger spent 1804 and 1805 in a flurry of diplomatic activity to form a new coalition against France. Mutual suspicion between the British and the Russians eased in the face of several French political mistakes, and by April 1805, the first two had signed a treaty of alliance. Having been defeated twice in recent memory by France and keen on revenge, Austria also joined the coalition a few months later.

=== French military preparations ===
Prior to the formation of the Third Coalition, Napoleon had assembled the Army of England, an invasion force meant to carry out his planned invasion of Britain, around six camps at Boulogne in Northern France. Although they never set foot on British soil, Napoleon's troops received careful training for any possible military operation. Although boredom quickly set in among the troops, Napoleon paid many visits to conduct lavish parades to maintain their morale.

The units at Boulogne formed the core for what Napoleon would later call "La Grande Armée" ("The Great Army"). At the start, the French army had about 200,000 men organized into seven corps, which were large field units, containing about 36 to 40 cannon each and capable of independent action until other corps could arrive. On top, Napoleon created a cavalry reserve of 22,000 troopers organized into two cuirassier divisions, four mounted dragoon divisions and two divisions of dismounted dragoons and light cavalry, all supported by 24 artillery pieces. By 1805, the Grande Armée had grown to a force of 350,000, was equipped and trained. It possessed a competent officer class where almost all from sergeants to marshals had experience in the recent Revolutionary Wars.

=== Austrian military preparations ===
Archduke Charles, brother of the Austrian Emperor, had started to reform the Austrian army in 1801 by taking away power from the Hofkriegsrat (Aulic Council), the military-political council responsible for decision making in the Austrian armed forces. Charles was Austria's most able field commander, but he was unpopular with the royal court and lost much influence when, against his advice, Austria decided to go to war with France.

Mack became the new main commander in Austria's army, instituting reforms on the infantry on the eve of war that called for a regiment to be composed of four battalions of four companies, rather than the older three battalions of six companies. The sudden change came with no corresponding officer training; new units were led by commanders who had not been given sufficient tactical training in using their units.

Austrian cavalry forces were regarded as the best in Europe, but the detachment of many cavalry units to various infantry formations precluded the hitting power of their massed French counterparts, who could be ordered by Napoleon to amass a whole corps of cavalry to influence the battle.

== Campaign ==
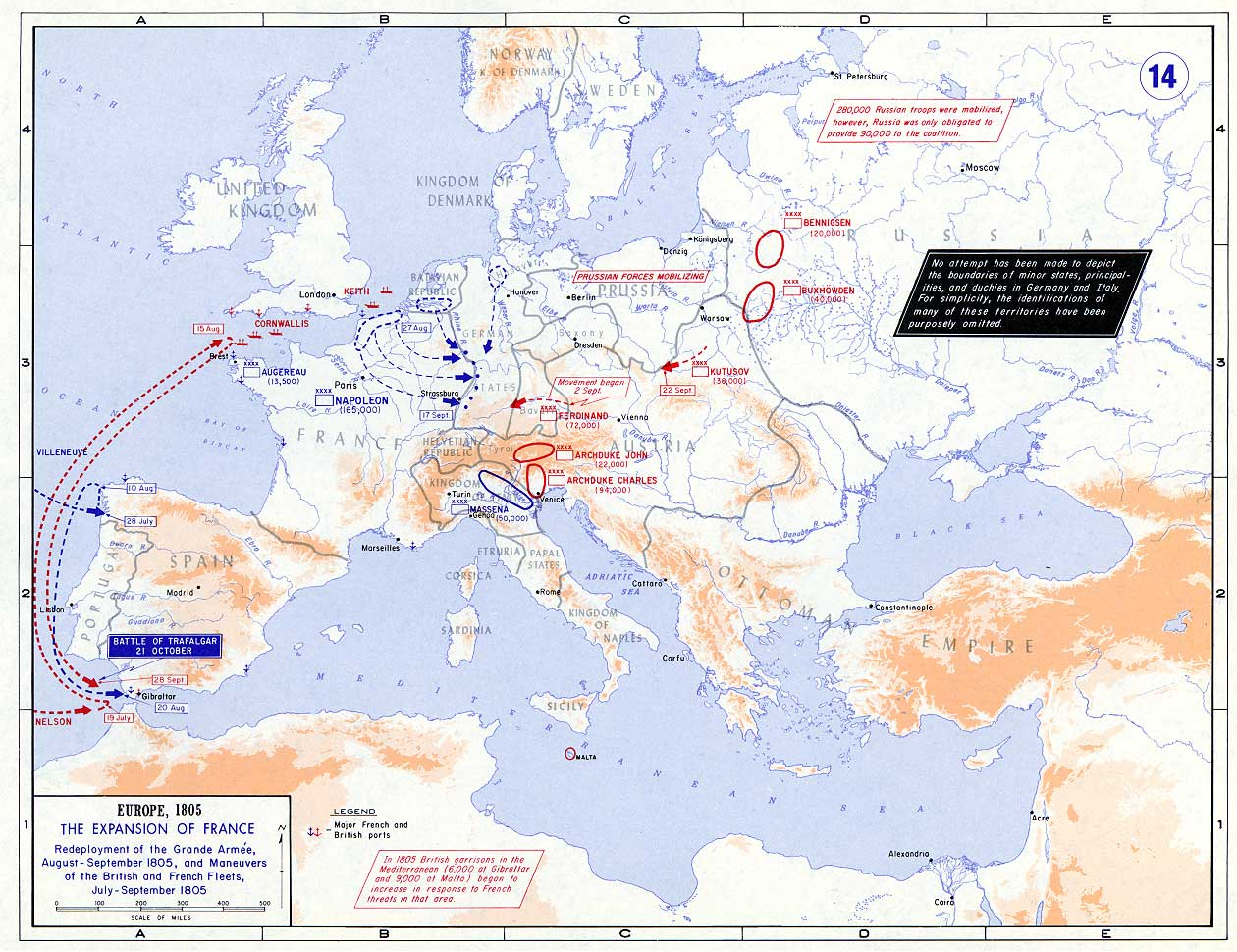
European strategic situation in 1805 before the start of the Ulm campaign

The Ulm campaign lasted for nearly a month and saw the French army under Napoleon deliver blow after blow to the confused Austrians. It culminated on 20 October with the loss of an entire Austrian army.

=== Austrian plans and preparations ===
On 9 September 1805, an Austrian army directed by Mack but under the nominal command of General der Kavallerie Archduke Ferdinand Karl Joseph of Austria-Este crossed the frontier into the Electorate of Bavaria without a declaration of war. It was hoped that the Austrian army, would compel the Bavarian army to join the Third Coalition against France. However, the Bavarian elector had signed a secret treaty with France and moved his army north to Würzburg in order to rendezvous with French forces. By 18 September, Mack's army was arrayed near Ulm where it watched the Black Forest to the west. Mack expected that it would take the French two months to react, but Emperor Napoleon's Grand Army was already on the march and by 24 September it was on the Rhine River.

Mack's initial deployment of the Austrian army was as follows. FML Johann Kollowrat with 24 battalions was posted at Ulm. FML Michael von Kienmayer guarded Mack's right rear on the Danube River at Ingolstadt with 6 battalions and 16 squadrons. The other forces lay farther south. They were FML Karl Philipp, Prince of Schwarzenberg, with 21 battalions and 46 squadrons near Ravensburg, FML Franz Xaver von Auffenberg with 14 battalions and 8 squadrons at Kempten, FML Franz Jellacic with 19 battalions and 8 squadrons at Lindau on Lake Constance, and FML Franz von Werneck with 15 battalions and 8 squadrons at Landsberg am Lech. Altogether, the Austrian army in Bavaria numbered 66,000 infantry and 9,000 cavalry. Mack expected that the French army would attack from the west.

Mack thought that Austrian security relied on sealing off the gaps through the mountainous Black Forest area in southern Germany that had witnessed much fighting during the campaigns of the French Revolutionary Wars. Mack believed that there would be no action in central Germany. Mack decided to make the city of Ulm the centerpiece of his defensive strategy, which called for a containment of the French until the Russians under Kutuzov could arrive and alter the odds against Napoleon. Ulm was protected by the heavily fortified Michelsberg heights, giving Mack the impression that the city was virtually impregnable from outside attack.

Fatally, the Aulic Council decided to make Northern Italy the main theater of operations for the Habsburgs. Archduke Charles was assigned 95,000 troops and directed to cross the Adige River with Mantua, Peschiera, and Milan as the initial objectives. The Austrians based an army of 72,000 men on Ulm. Nominally commanded by Archduke Ferdinand, the army's real authority was Mack. Austrian strategy required that Archduke John with 23,000 troops secure the Tyrol and provide the link between his brother Charles's army and his cousin Ferdinand's army. The Austrians also detached individual corps to serve with the Swedish in Pomerania and the British in Naples, though these were designed to confuse the French and divert their resources.

=== French plans and preparations ===
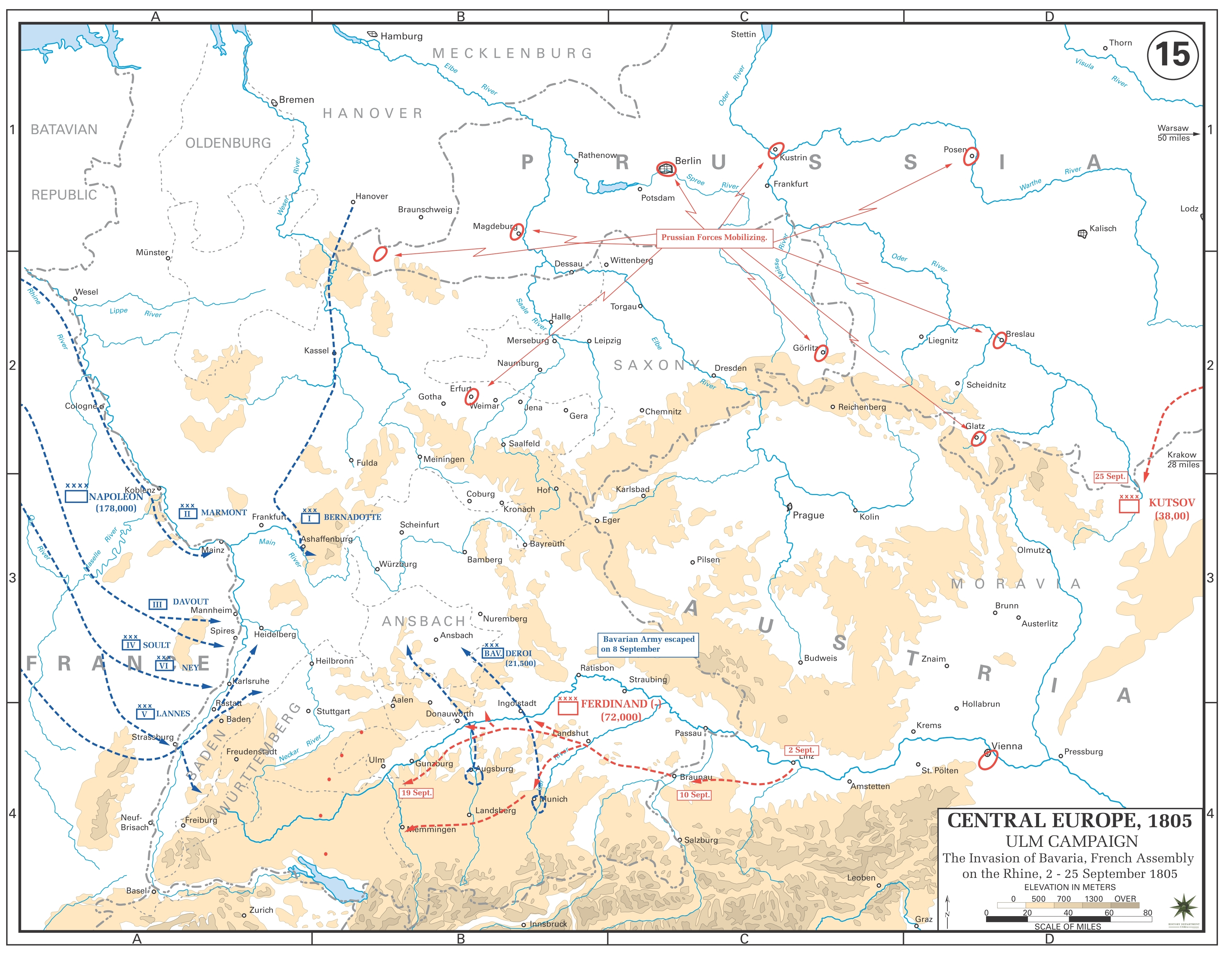
The French concentrated around the Rhine from early to mid-September. 210,000 troops of the Grande Armée prepared to cross into Germany and encircle the Austrians.

In both the campaigns of 1796 and 1800, Napoleon had envisaged the Danube theater as the central focus of French efforts, but in both instances the Italian theater became the most important. The Aulic Council thought Napoleon would strike in Italy again. Napoleon had other intentions: 210,000 French troops would be launched eastwards from the camps of Boulogne and would envelop General Mack's exposed Austrian army if it kept marching towards the Black Forest. Meanwhile, Marshal Murat would conduct cavalry screens across the Black Forest to fool the Austrians into thinking that the French were advancing on a direct west-east axis. The main attack in Germany would be supported by French assaults in other theaters: Marshal Masséna would confront Charles in Italy with 50,000 men of the Armée d'Italie, St. Cyr would march to Naples with 20,000 men, and Marshal Brune would patrol Boulogne with 30,000 troops against a possible British invasion.

Murat and Henri Gratien, Comte Bertrand conducted reconnaissance between the area bordering the Tyrol and the Main as Anne Jean Marie René Savary, chief of the planning staff, drew up detailed road surveys of the areas between the Rhine and the Danube. The left wing of the Grande Armée would move from Hanover in northern Germany and Utrecht in the Netherlands to fall on Württemberg; the right and center, troops from the Channel coast, would concentrate along the Middle Rhine around cities like Mannheim and Strasbourg. While Murat was making demonstrations across the Black Forest, other French forces would then invade the German heartland and swing towards the southeast by capturing Augsburg, a move that was supposed to isolate Mack and interrupt the Austrian lines of communication.

=== The French invasion ===
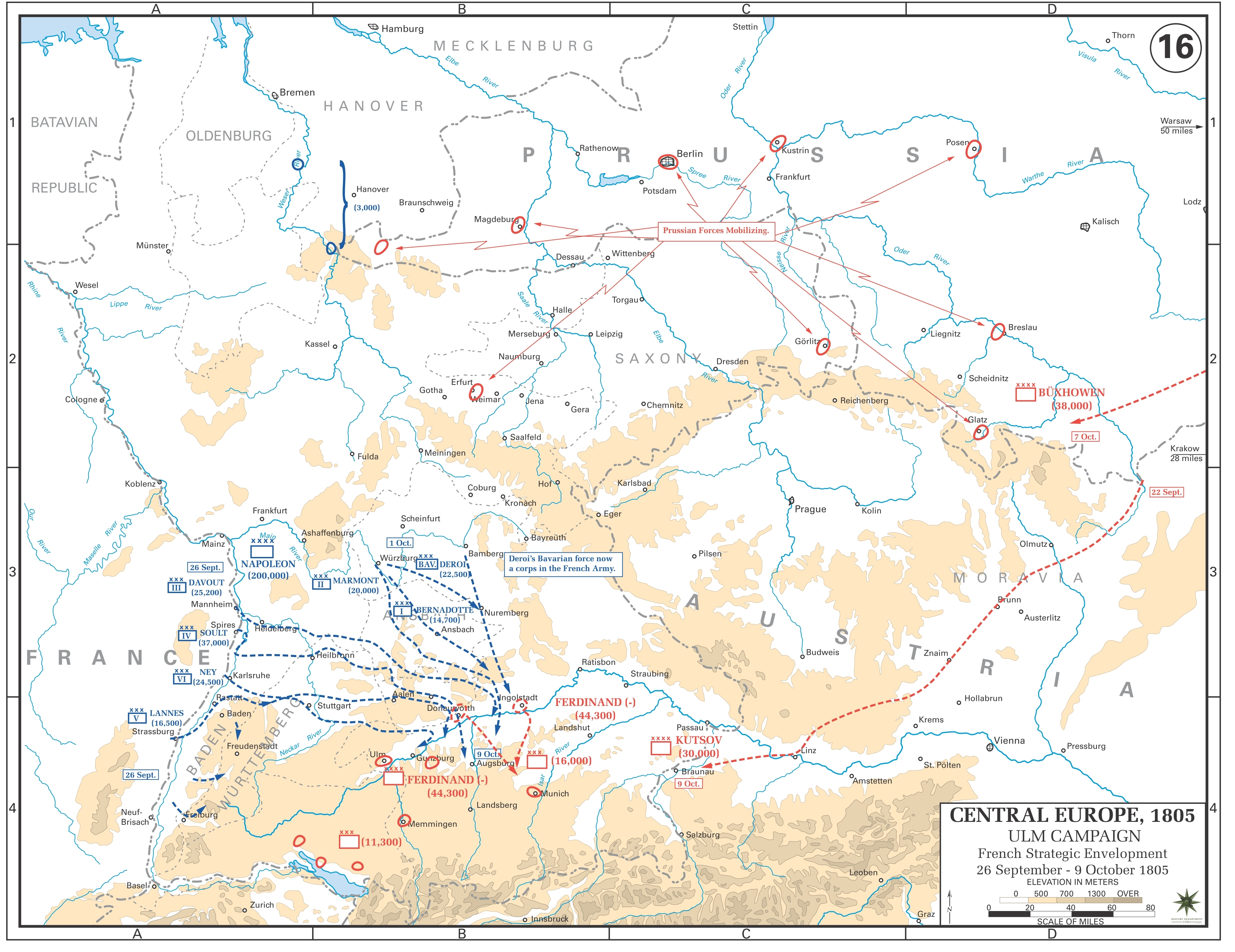
The French invasion in late September and early October caught the Austrians unprepared and severed their lines of communication.

On 22 September Mack decided to hold the Iller line anchored on Ulm. In the last three days of September, the French began the furious marches that would place them at the Austrian rear. Mack believed that the French would not violate Prussian territory, but when he heard that Marshal Jean Baptiste Bernadotte's I Corps had marched through Prussian Ansbach, he made the critical decision to stay and defend Ulm rather than retreat to the south, which would have offered a reasonable opportunity at saving the bulk of his forces. Napoleon had little accurate information about Mack's intentions or maneuvers; he knew that Kienmayer's Corps was sent to Ingolstadt east of the French positions, but his agents greatly exaggerated its size. On 5 October Napoleon ordered Marshal Michel Ney to join Marshals Jean Lannes, Nicolas Jean de Dieu Soult, and Murat in concentrating and crossing the Danube at Donauwörth. The French encirclement, however, was not deep enough to prevent Kienmayer's escape: the French corps did not all arrive at the same place – they instead deployed on a long west-east axis – and the early arrival of Soult and Davout at Donauwörth induced Kienmayer to exercise caution and evasion. Napoleon gradually became more convinced that the Austrians were massed at Ulm and ordered sizeable portions of the French army to concentrate around Donauwörth; on 6 October three French infantry and cavalry corps headed to Donauwörth to seal off Mack's escape route.

Realizing the danger of his position, Mack decided to go on the offensive. On 8 October he commanded the army to concentrate around Günzburg and hoped to strike at Napoleon's lines of communication. Mack instructed Kienmayer to draw Napoleon further east towards Munich and Augsburg. Napoleon did not seriously consider the possibility that Mack would cross the Danube and move away from his central base, but he did realize that seizing the bridges at Günzburg would yield a large strategic advantage. To accomplish this objective, Napoleon sent Ney's Corps to Günzburg, completely unaware that the bulk of the Austrian army was heading to the same destination. On 8 October, however, the campaign witnessed its first serious battle at Wertingen between Auffenberg's troops and those of Murat and Lannes.

=== Battle of Wertingen ===
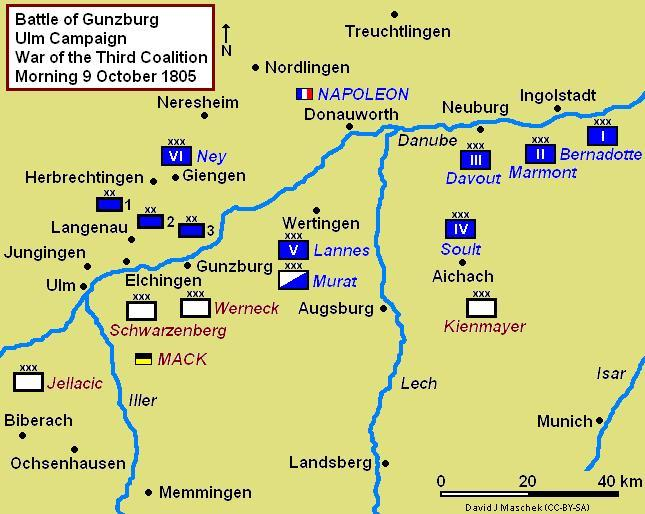
Battle of Günzburg, 9 October 1805

For reasons not entirely clear, on 7 October Mack ordered Auffenberg to take his division of 5,000 infantry and 400 cavalry from Günzburg to Wertingen in preparation for the main Austrian advance out of Ulm. Uncertain of what to do and having little hope for reinforcements, Auffenberg was in a dangerous position. The first French forces to arrive were Murat's cavalry divisions – General of Division (GD) Louis Klein's 1st Dragoon Division, GD Marc Antoine de Beaumont's 3rd Dragoon Division, and GD Etienne de Nansouty's 1st Cuirassier Division. They began to assault the Austrian positions and were soon joined by GD Nicolas Oudinot's grenadiers, who were hoping to outflank the Austrians from the northeast. Auffenberg attempted a retreat to the southwest, but he was not quick enough: the Austrians lost nearly their entire force, 1,000 to 2,000 of which were taken prisoner. The Battle of Wertingen had been an easy French victory.

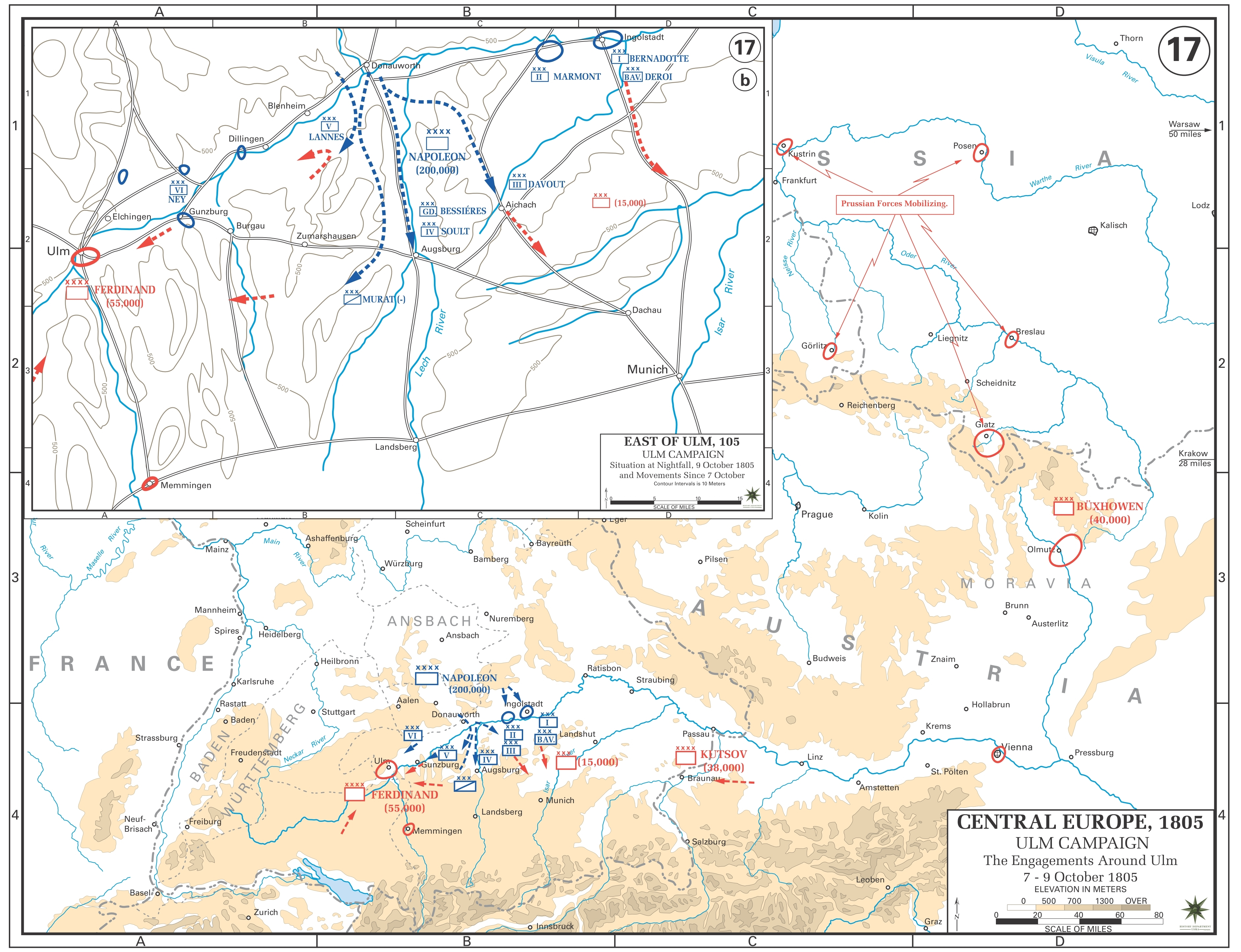
The strategic situation from 7 to 9 October. With General Mikhail Kutuzov too far away to offer significant aid, the Austrians found themselves in a precarious position.

The action at Wertingen convinced Mack to operate on the left (north) bank of the Danube instead of making a direct eastwards retreat on the right bank. This would require the Austrian army to cross to the north at Günzburg. On 8 October Ney was operating under Marshal Louis Alexandre Berthier's directions that called for a direct attack on Ulm the following day. Ney sent in GD Jean-Pierre Firmin Malher's 3rd Division to capture the Günzburg bridges over the Danube. In the Battle of Günzburg, a column of this division ran into some Tyrolean jaegers and captured 200 of them, including their commander Konstantin Ghilian Karl d'Aspré, along with two cannons. The Austrians noticed these developments and reinforced their positions around Günzburg with three infantry battalions and 20 cannons. Malher's division conducted several heroic attacks against the Austrian positions, but all failed. Mack then sent in Ignaz Gyulai with seven infantry battalions and fourteen cavalry squadrons to repair the destroyed bridges, but this force was charged and swept away by the delayed French 59th Infantry Regiment. Fierce fighting ensued and the French finally managed to establish a foothold on the right (south) bank of the Danube. While the Battle of Günzburg was being fought, Ney sent GD Louis Henri Loison's 2nd Division to capture the Danube bridges at Elchingen, which were lightly defended by the Austrians. Having lost most of the Danube bridges, Mack marched his army back to Ulm. By 10 October Ney's corps had made significant progress: Malher's 3rd division had crossed to the right (south) bank, Loison's 2nd division held Elchingen, and Pierre Dupont de l'Étang's 1st Division was heading towards Ulm.

=== Haslach-Jungingen and Elchingen ===
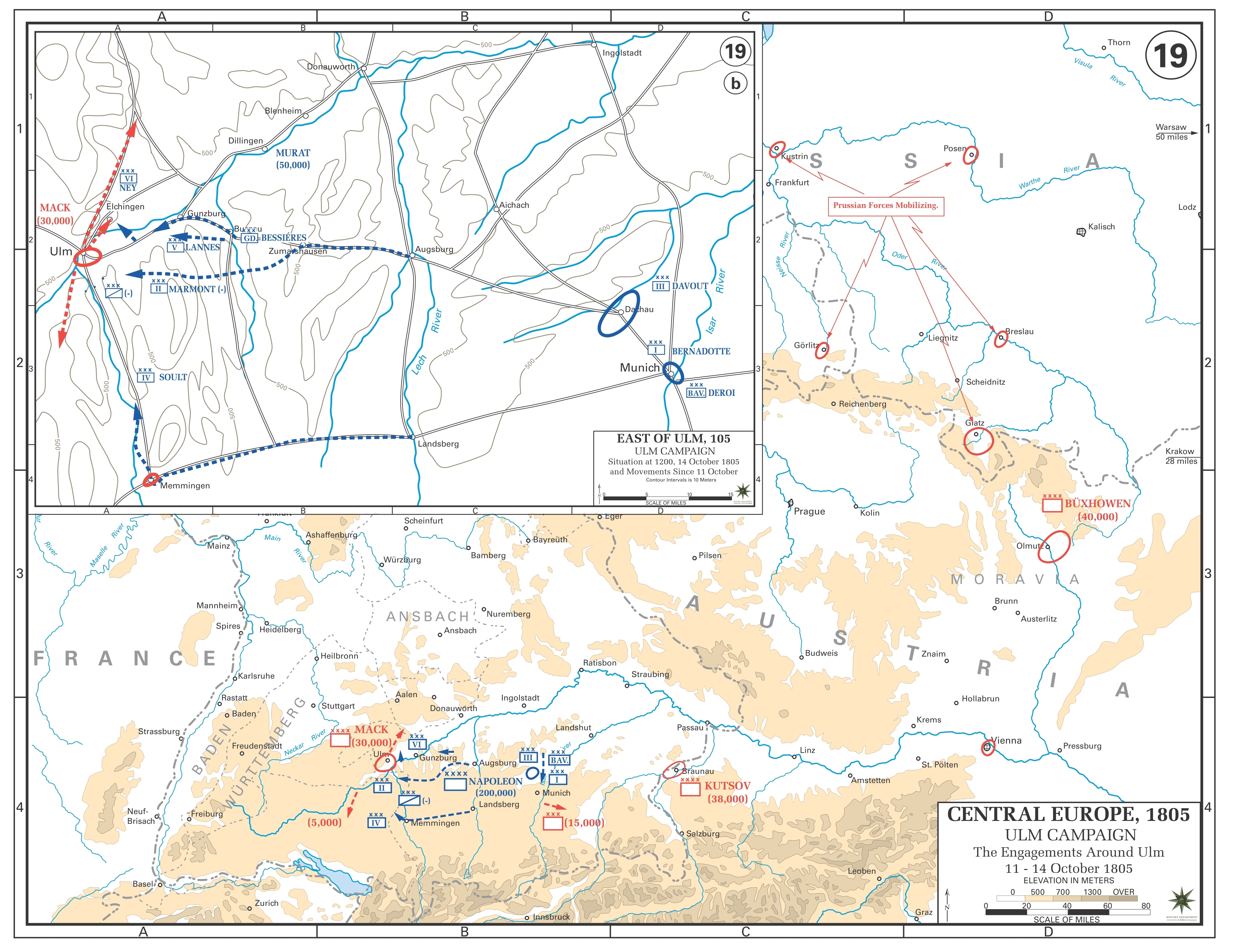
The strategic situation from 11 to 14 October. The French hurl themselves westwards to capture the Austrian army.

The demoralized Austrian army arrived at Ulm in the early hours of 10 October. Mack was deliberating his course of action and the Austrian army remained inactive at Ulm until the 11th. Meanwhile, Napoleon was operating under flawed assumptions: he believed the Austrians were moving to the east or southeast and that Ulm was lightly guarded. Ney sensed this misapprehension and wrote to Berthier that Ulm was, in fact, more heavily defended than the French originally thought. During this time, the Russian threat to the east began to preoccupy Napoleon so much that Murat was given command of the right wing of the army, consisting of Ney's and Lannes's corps. The French were separated in two massive wings at this point: the forces of Ney, Lannes, and Murat to the west were containing Mack while those of Soult, Davout, Bernadotte, and GD Auguste Marmont to the east were charged with guarding against any possible Russian and Austrian incursions. On 11 October Ney made a renewed push on Ulm; the 2nd and 3rd divisions were to march to the city along the right bank of the Danube while Dupont's division, supported by one dragoon division, was to march directly for Ulm and seize the entire city. The orders were hopeless because Ney still did not know that the entire Austrian army was stationed at Ulm.

The 32nd Infantry Regiment in Dupont's division marched from Haslach towards Ulm and ran into four Austrian regiments holding Boefingen. The 32nd carried out several ferocious attacks, but the Austrians held firm and repulsed every one. The Austrians flooded the battle with more cavalry and infantry regiments to Ulm-Jungingen hoping to score a knockout blow against Ney's corps by enveloping Dupont's force. Dupont sensed what was happening and preempted the Austrians by launching a surprise attack on Jungingen, during which he took as prisoner at least 4,000 of the Austrians. Renewed Austrian attacks drove these forces back to Haslach, which the French managed to hold. Dupont was eventually forced to fall back on Albeck, where he joined Louis Baraguey d'Hilliers's foot dragoons division. The effects of the Battle of Haslach-Jungingen on Napoleon's plans are not fully clear, but the Emperor may have finally ascertained that the majority of the Austrian army was concentrated at Ulm. Accordingly, Napoleon sent the corps of Soult and Marmont towards the Iller, meaning he now had four infantry and one cavalry corps to deal with Mack; Davout, Bernadotte, and the Bavarians were still guarding the region around Munich. Napoleon did not intend to fight a battle across rivers and ordered his marshals to capture the important bridges around Ulm. He also began shifting his forces to the north of Ulm because he expected a battle in that region rather than an encirclement of the city itself. These dispositions and actions would lead to a confrontation at Elchingen on the 14th as Ney's forces advanced on Albeck.

At this point in the campaign, the Austrian command staff was in full confusion. Ferdinand began to openly oppose Mack's command style and decisions, charging that the latter spent his days writing contradictory orders that left the Austrian army marching back and forth. On 13 October Mack sent two columns out of Ulm in preparation for a breakout to the north: one under Johann Sigismund Riesch headed towards Elchingen to secure the bridge there and the other under Franz von Werneck went north with most of the heavy artillery. Ney hurried his corps forward to reestablish contact with Dupont, who was still north of the Danube. Ney led Loison's division to the south of Elchingen on the right bank of the Danube to begin the attack. Malher's division crossed the river farther east and moved west toward Riesch's position. The field was a partially wooded flood plain, rising steeply to the hill town of Elchingen, which had a wide field of view. The French cleared the Austrian pickets from a bridge, then a regiment boldly attacked and captured the abbey at the top of the hill at bayonet point. During the Battle of Elchingen, the Austrian cavalry was also defeated and Reisch's infantry fled toward Ulm. Ney was given the title Duke of Elchingen for his impressive victory.

=== Battle of Ulm ===
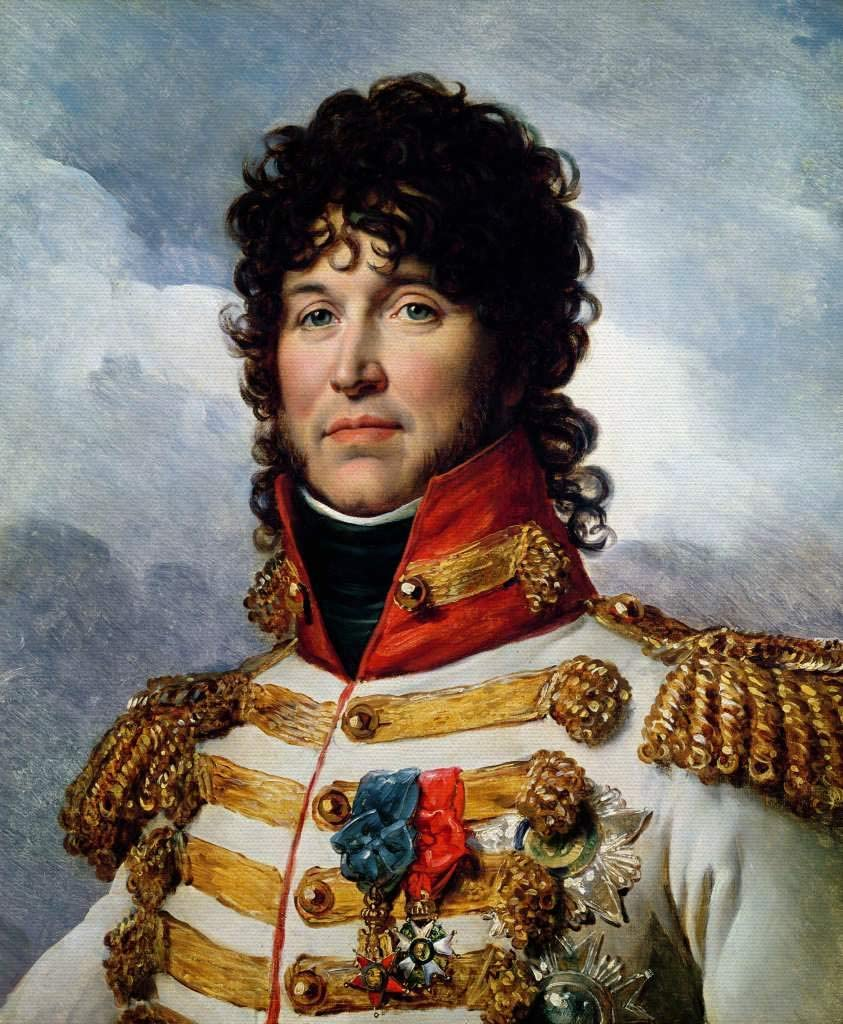
Marshal Murat proved instrumental during the Ulm campaign.

On 13 October Soult's IV Corps fell on Memmingen from the east. After a minor clash that resulted in 16 French casualties, General-Major Karl Spangen von Uyternesse surrendered 4,600 soldiers, eight guns, and nine colors. The Austrians were low on ammunition, cut off from Ulm, and completely demoralized by the confusion reigning at army headquarters.

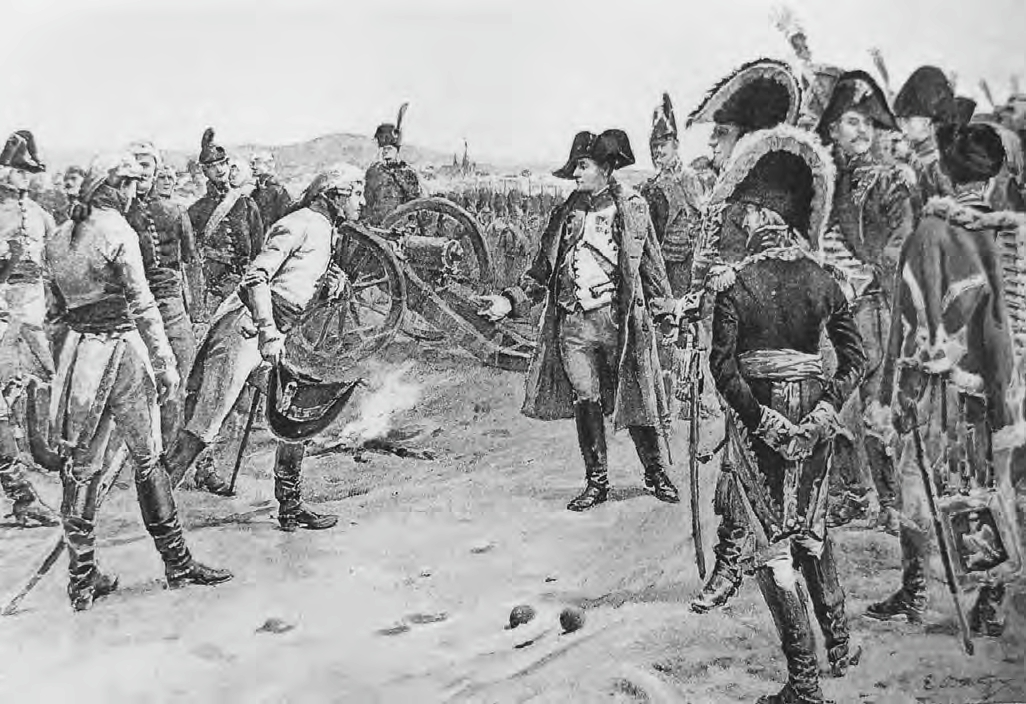
Mack surrenders to Napoleon at Ulm by Paul-Émile Boutigny

More actions took place on the 14th. Murat's forces joined Dupont at Albeck just in time to drive off an Austrian attack from Werneck; together Murat and Dupont beat the Austrians to the north in the direction of Heidenheim. By night on the 14th, two French corps were stationed in the vicinity of the Austrian encampments at Michelsberg, right outside of Ulm. Mack was now in a dangerous situation: there was no longer any hope of escaping along the north bank, Marmont and the Imperial Guard were hovering at the outskirts of Ulm to the south of the river, and Soult was moving north from Memmingen to prevent the Austrians escaping south to the Tyrol. Troubles continued with the Austrian command as Ferdinand overrode the objections of Mack and ordered the evacuation of all cavalry from Ulm, a total of 6,000 troopers. Murat's pursuit was so effective, however, that only eleven squadrons joined Werneck at Heidenheim. Murat continued his harassment of Werneck and forced him to surrender with 8,000 men at Trochtelfingen on 19 October; Murat also took an entire Austrian field park of 500 vehicles, then swept on towards Neustadt an der Donau and captured 12,000 Austrians. (Note: Trochtelfingen is located midway between Bopfingen and Nördlingen and is not to be confused with Trochtelfingen in Baden-Württemberg, which is farther west.)

Events at Ulm were now reaching a conclusion. On 15 October Ney's troops successfully charged the Michelsberg encampments and on the 16th the French began to bombard Ulm itself. Austrian morale was at a low point and Mack began to realize that there was little hope of rescue. On 17 October Napoleon's emissary, Ségur, signed a convention with Mack in which the Austrians agreed to surrender on 25 October if no aid came by that date. Gradually, however, Mack heard of the capitulations at Heidenheim and Neresheim and agreed to surrender five days before schedule on 20 October. Fifteen hundred troops from the Austrian garrison managed to escape, but the vast majority of the Austrian force marched out on 21 October and laid down their arms without incident, all with the Grande Armée drawn up in a vast semicircle observing the capitulation (see infobox picture). The officers were permitted to leave, pending their signatures on a parole in which they agreed not to take up arms against France until they were exchanged. More than ten general officers were included in this agreement, including Mack, Johann von Klenau, Maximilian Anton Karl, Count Baillet de Latour, Prince Liechtenstein, and Ignaz Gyulai.

== Aftermath ==
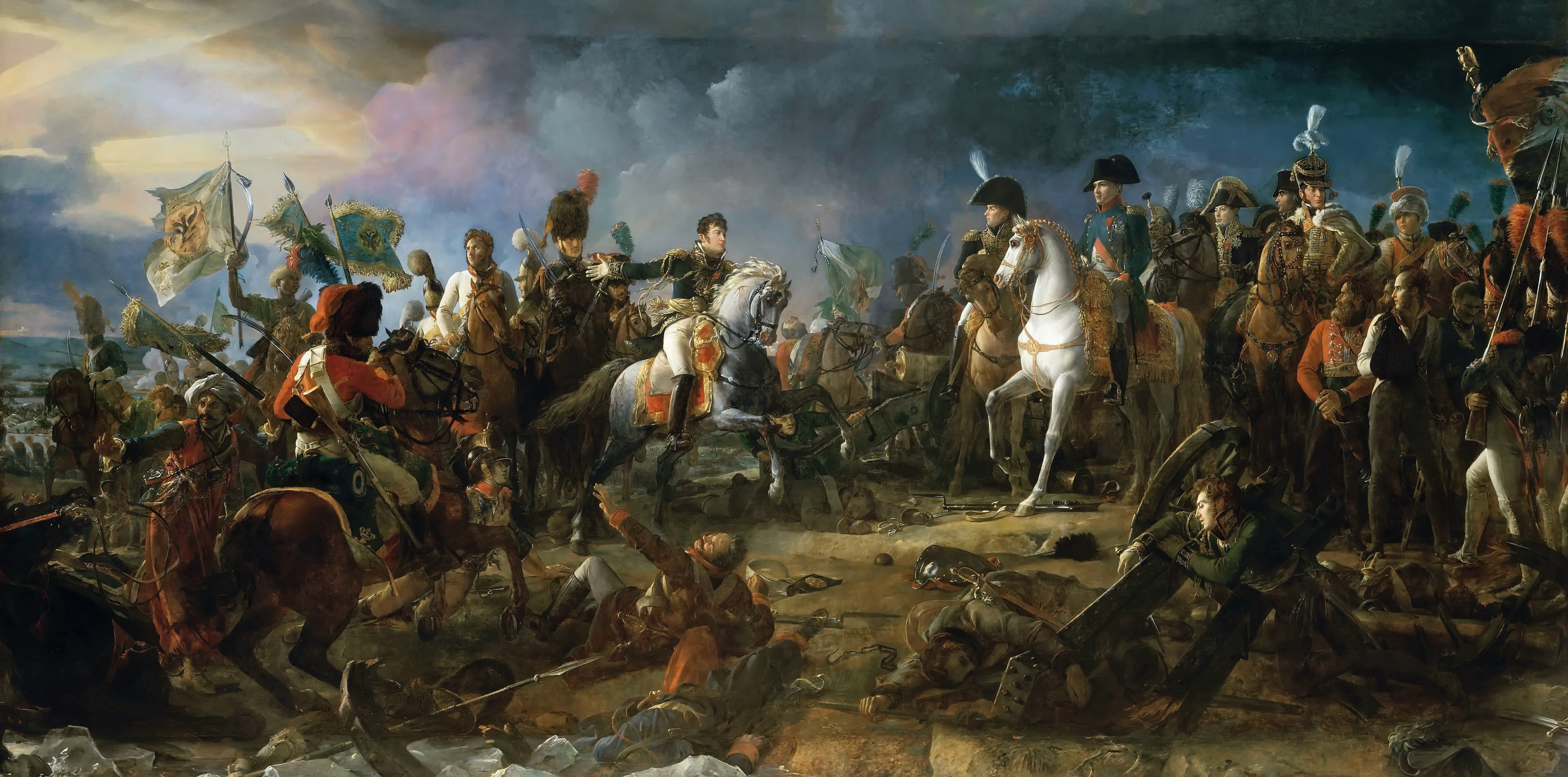
On 2 December 1805 the French crushed a combined Russo-Austrian army in the Battle of Austerlitz. Austria agreed to end her participation in the Third Coalition with the Treaty of Pressburg on 26 December.

As the Austrians were marching out of Ulm to surrender, a combined Franco-Spanish fleet was being destroyed at the Battle of Trafalgar. This decisive British victory ended the naval threat from France and ensured British naval domination for the next century.

Despite this setback, the Ulm campaign had been a spectacular victory and had witnessed the elimination of an entire Austrian army at very little cost for the French; additionally, the road to the Austrian capital of Vienna was wide open and Napoleon would conquer the city a month later. The 8th bulletin of the Grande Armée described the scale of the achievement:

Thirty thousand men, among them 2,000 cavalry, together with 60 guns and 40 standards have fallen into the hands of the victors....Since the beginning of the war, the total number of prisoners taken can be evaluated at 60,000, the number of standards at 80 without listing the artillery or baggage trains....Never have victories been so complete and less costly.

Marshal Augereau's arrival from Brest with the newly formed VII Corps gave the French one more piece of good news. In the Capitulation of Dornbirn on 13 November, Franjo Jelačić's division was cornered and forced to surrender. The Russians withdrew to the northeast after Mack's capitulation and Vienna fell on 12 November. The Allies were thoroughly defeated at the Battle of Austerlitz in December and Austria was permanently knocked out of the Third Coalition a few weeks later. The French victory highlighted the effectiveness of la manoeuvre sur les derrières, a special type of strategic envelopment first used by Napoleon in his Italian campaign in 1796. The maneuver called for a pinning force that would occupy a broad front of the enemy line while other supporting units positioned themselves at a specific location in the enemy's flank or rear. As the enemy became more embroiled with the pinning force, the flanking troops would attack at a critical spot and seal the victory. In the Ulm campaign, Murat's cavalry served as the pinning force that fooled the Austrians into thinking the main French attack would come from the Black Forest. As Murat lulled the Austrians towards Ulm, the main French forces crashed through Central Germany and separated Mack's army from the other theaters of the war.

=== Significance ===
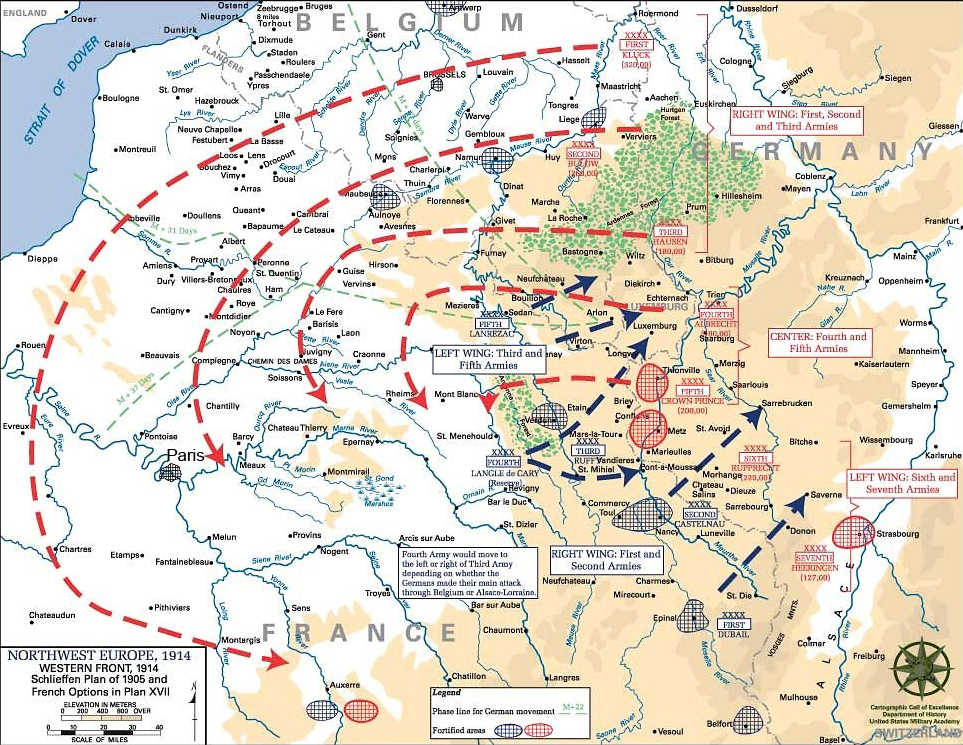
The Schlieffen Plan, emphasizing maneuver and envelopment, owed much to the Ulm campaign.

The Ulm campaign is considered to be one of the greatest historical examples of a strategic turning movement; for instance, in his Harper Encyclopedia of Military History, Dupuy would describe it in the following terms: "Ulm was not a battle; it was a strategic victory so complete and so overwhelming that the issue was never seriously contested in tactical combat. Also, This campaign opened the most brilliant year of Napoleon's career. His army had been trained to perfection; his plans were faultless".

Historians often analyze the campaign on a wide strategic level that does not include tactical confrontations, but they were common and relevant. The decisive victory at Ulm is also believed to be a product of the long training and preparation the Grande Armée received at the camps of Boulogne. The Grande Armée carried little baggage, invaded enemy territory at harvest time and marched far faster than the Austrians had expected. The campaign highlighted the utility of the Corps d'Armée system; corps went on to become the fundamental strategic building block for the major wars in the 19th and the 20th centuries. A typical corps might have three infantry divisions, a light cavalry brigade for reconnaissance and reserve artillery batteries in addition to those attached to each division. Their increased size allowed them to fight without support for long periods of time, as Ney did, and their durability permitted them to spread out and subsist by requisitioning local food. The French needed about an eighth of the transport used by contemporary armies, which gave them a level of mobility and flexibility unseen at that time. Invasions of southern Germany by Marlborough and Moreau covered a narrow front, but the Grande Armée invaded in 1805 on a front that was 100 miles (161 km) wide, an action that took the Austrians by complete surprise and caused them to underestimate the gravity of the situation.

== In popular culture ==
The Ulm campaign is included in Leo Tolstoy's novel War and Peace.

== Sources ==
- Bonaparte, Napoleon (October 27, 1805). "Douzième Bulletin de la Grande Armée" (in French). Munich, Bavaria, Germany. Archived from the original on July 19, 2011 – via Histoire-Empire.org
  Published on the date 5 Brumaire, year 14 of the French Republican Calendar; October 27, 1805, in the Gregorian calendar
- Brooks, Richard (January 1, 2000). Brooks, Richard; Drury, Ian (eds.). Atlas of World Military History: The Art of War from Ancient Times to the Present Day (4th ed.). New York City, New York: Barnes & Noble. ISBN 978-0-76072-025-7.
- Chandler, David G.; et al. (Graphics and illustrations by Shelia Waters, design by Abe Lerner) (2009) [1966]. Lerner, Abe (ed.). The Campaigns of Napoleon: The mind and method of history's greatest soldier. Vol. I (4th ed.). New York City, New York: Simon & Schuster. ISBN 9781439131039 – via Google Books.
- Clodfelter, M. (2017). Warfare and Armed Conflicts: A Statistical Encyclopedia of Casualty and Other Figures, 1492-2015 (4th ed.). Jefferson, North Carolina: McFarland. ISBN 978-0-7864-7470-7.
- Connelly, Owen (2012) [2005]. The Wars of the French Revolution and Napoleon, 1792-1815 (3rd ed.). Abingdon-on-Thames, England: Routledge (Taylor & Francis). doi:10.4324/9780203965948. ISBN 978-0-415-23983-7 – via Google Books.
- Dupuy, R. Ernest; Dupuy, Trevor N. (1993) [1977]. The Harper Encyclopedia of Military History: From 3500 B.C. to the Present (4th ed.). New York City, New York: HarperCollins. ISBN 0062700561.
- Fisher, Todd; Fremont-Barnes, Gregory; et al. (Foreword by Bernard Cornwell) (April 27, 2004). The Napoleonic Wars: The Rise and Fall of an Empire. Essential Histories Specials (1st ed.). Oxford, England: Osprey Publishing. ISBN 978-1-84176-831-1.
- Forster Groom & Co. Ltd. (1912). "Map of Central Europe showing the routes taken by Napoleon to defeat the allied Russo-Austrian army at the Battle of Ulm on 16–19 October 1805 and the Battle of Austerlitz in December 1805" (Military map). Sketch Map illustrating Napoleon's Campaign in 1805 (Ulm & Austerlitz). 1:1,600,000. Whitehall Campaign Series. Cartography by Forster Groom & Co. Ltd. London, England: Forster Groom & Co. Ltd. Vol. 11 – via Trove (National Library of Australia).
- Goetz, Robert (1964). 1805, Austerlitz : Napoleon and the destruction of the Third Coalition. Greenhill Books. ISBN 978-1-85367-644-4.
- Kagan, Frederick W.; et al. (Design by Lisa Kreinbrink) (September 10, 2007) [2006]. The End of the Old Order: Napoleon and Europe, 1801-1805. Vol. I (2nd ed.). Cambridge, Massachusetts: Da Capo Press (Perseus Books Group). ISBN 978-0-306-81137-1 – via Google Books.
- Maude, Frederic Natusch (1912). The Ulm Campaign, 1805: The Special Campaign Series. Vol. XII (1st ed.). London, England: George Allen & Company, Ltd. – via Internet Archive.
- Mikaberidze, Alexander (January 13, 2020). The Napoleonic Wars: A Global History (1st ed.). New York City, New York: Oxford University Press. ISBN 978-0-199951062. LCCN 2019019279 – via Google Books.
- Nafziger, George F. (2002). Woronoff, Jon (ed.). Historical Dictionary of the Napoleonic Era. Historical Dictionaries of Ancient Civilizations and Historical Eras. Vol. 6 (1st ed.). Lanham, Maryland: Scarecrow Press. ISBN 9780810866171 – via Google Books.
- Schneid, Frederick C. (July 1, 2012). Napoleonic Wars: The Essential Bibliography (1st ed.). Dulles, Virginia: Potomac Books. ISBN 978-1-59797-209-3. OCLC 967521768 – via Google Books.
- Schneid, Frederick C. (2005). Napoleon's Conquest of Europe: The War of the Third Coalition. Westport, Conn.: Praeger Publishers. ISBN 0-275-98096-0.
- Smith, Digby (1998). The Napoleonic Wars Data Book. London: Greenhill. ISBN 1-85367-276-9.
- Uffindell, Andrew (2003). Great Generals of the Napoleonic Wars. Kent: Spellmount Ltd. ISBN 1-86227-177-1.
