= Beaumont-Louestault =

- Commune
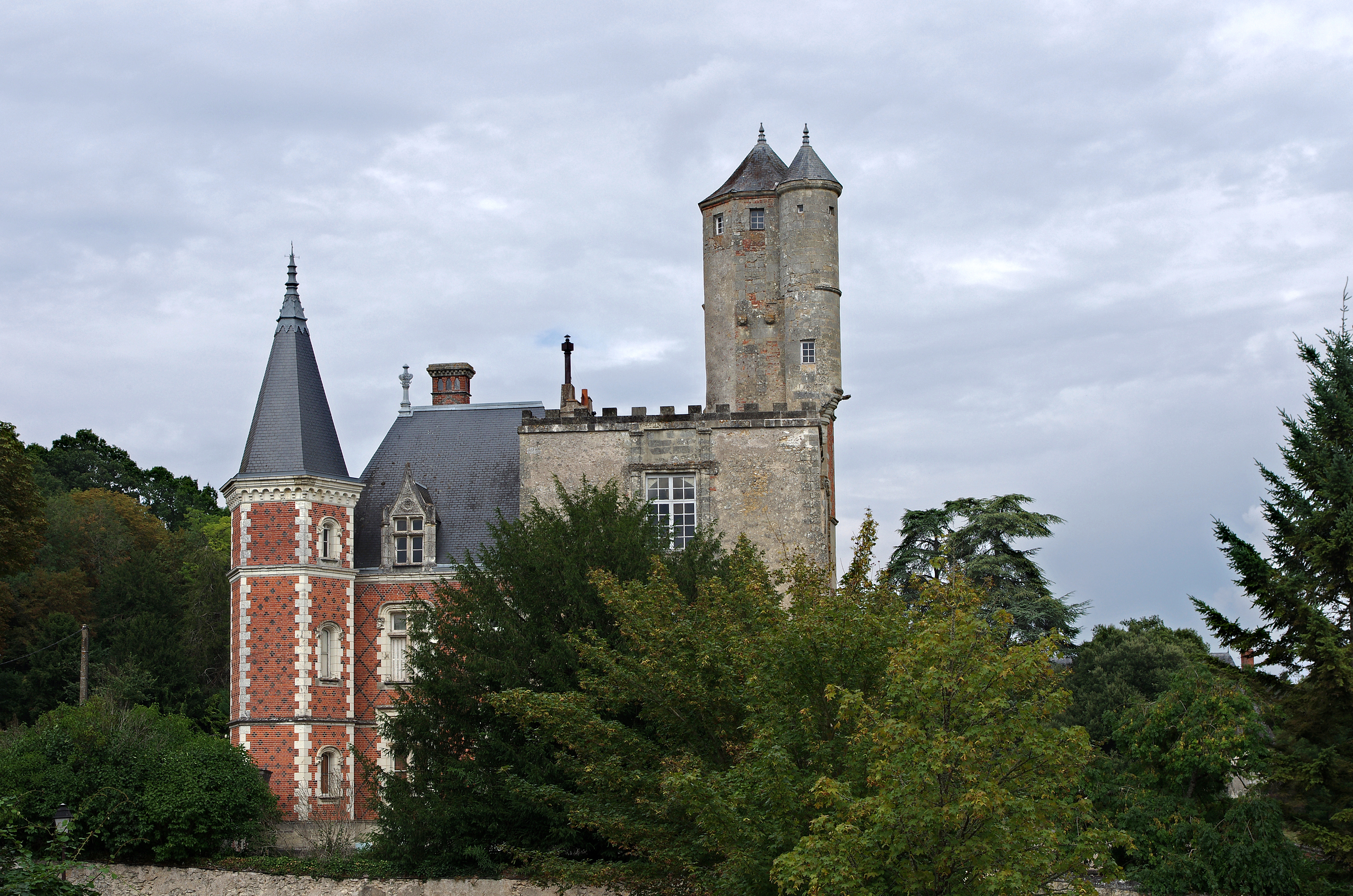
- Château de Beaumont
- Location of Beaumont-Louestault
- Location within France Location within Centre-Val de Loire
- Coordinates: 47°34′16″N 0°40′19″E
- Country: France
- Region: Centre-Val de Loire
- Department: Indre-et-Loire
- Arrondissement: Chinon
- Canton: Château-Renault
- Intercommunality: CC Gâtine-Racan

Government
  - Mayor (2020–2026): Jean-Paul Robert
- Area^{1}: 55.49 km^{2} (21.42 sq mi)
- Population (2023): 1,813
  - Density: 32.67/km^{2} (84.62/sq mi)
- Time zone: UTC+01:00 (CET)
  - Summer (DST): UTC+02:00 (CEST)
- INSEE/Postal code: 37021 /37360, 37370
- ^{1} French Land Register data, which excludes lakes, ponds, glaciers > 1 km^{2} (0.386 sq mi or 247 acres) and river estuaries.

Beaumont-Louestault (French pronunciation: [bomɔ̃ lweto]) is a commune in the department of Indre-et-Loire, central France. The municipality was established on 1 January 2017 by merging the former communes of Beaumont-la-Ronce (the head office) and Louestault.

== See also ==
- Communes of the Indre-et-Loire department
