= Louestault =

Commune in Indre-et-Loire, France

- Part of Beaumont-Louestault
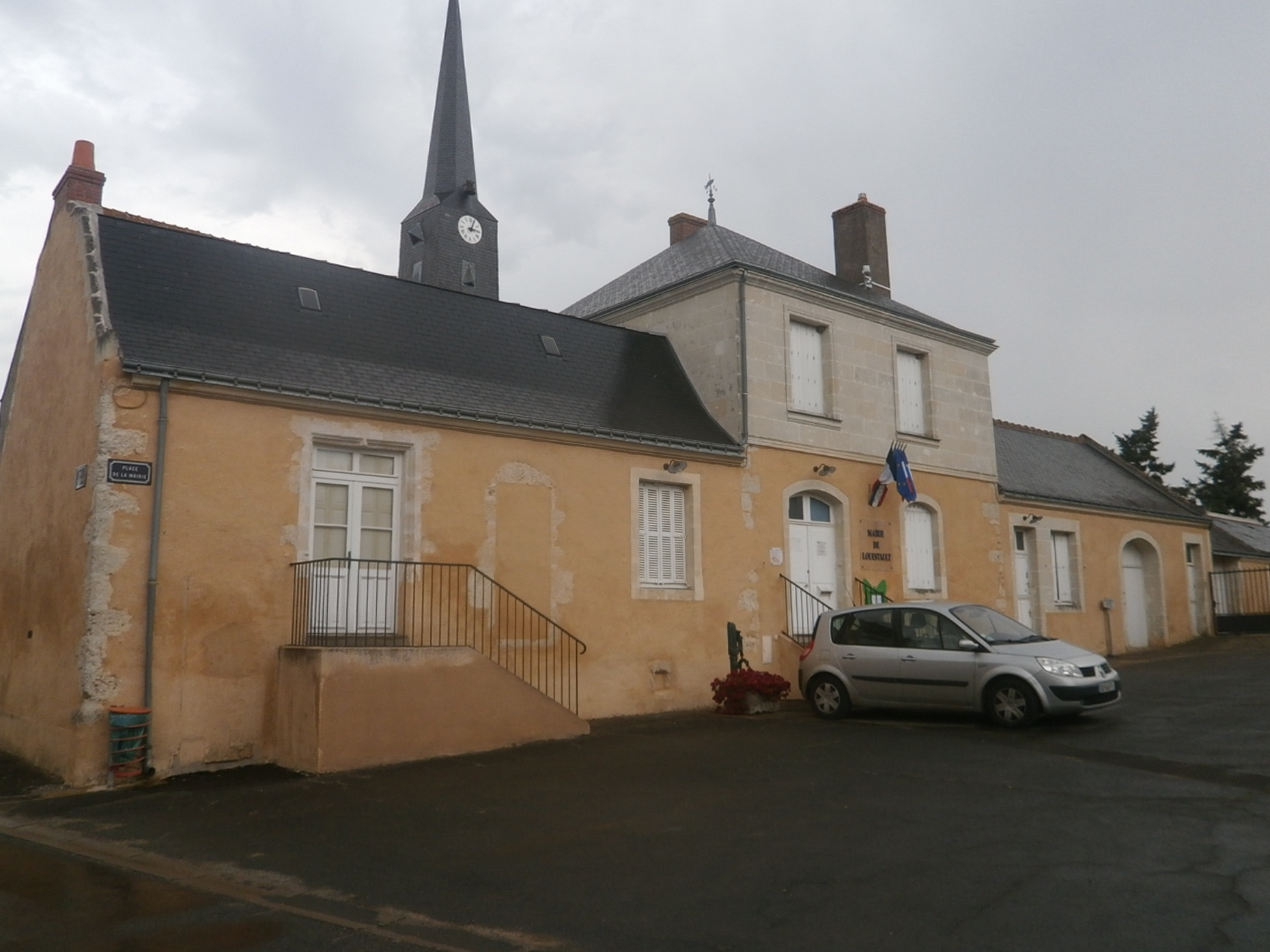
- Town hall
- Location of Louestault
- Location within France Location within Centre-Val de Loire
- Coordinates: 47°37′05″N 0°39′09″E
- Country: France
- Region: Centre-Val de Loire
- Department: Indre-et-Loire
- Arrondissement: Chinon
- Canton: Château-Renault
- Commune: Beaumont-Louestault
- Area^{1}: 16.45 km^{2} (6.35 sq mi)
- Highest elevation: 180 m (590 ft)
- Lowest elevation: 85 m (279 ft)
- Population (2019): 443
  - Density: 26.9/km^{2} (69.7/sq mi)
- Time zone: UTC+01:00 (CET)
  - Summer (DST): UTC+02:00 (CEST)
- Postal code: 37370
- ^{1} French Land Register data, which excludes lakes, ponds, glaciers > 1 km^{2} (0.386 sq mi or 247 acres) and river estuaries.

Louestault (French pronunciation: [lweto]) is a former commune in the Indre-et-Loire department in central France. On 1 January 2017, it was merged into the new commune Beaumont-Louestault.

== Population ==
Historical population

Year	Pop.	±% p.a.
1793	495	—
1821	402	−0.74%
1846	387	−0.15%
1872	324	−0.68%
1901	403	+0.76%
1926	389	−0.14%
1946	338	−0.70%
1962	291	−0.93%

Year	Pop.	±% p.a.
1968	266	−1.49%
1975	230	−2.06%
1982	229	−0.06%
1990	206	−1.31%
1999	290	+3.87%
2006	348	+2.64%
2019	443	+1.87%

Source: EHESS and INSEE

== See also ==
- Communes of the Indre-et-Loire department
