= Battle of Wertingen =

1805 Battle during the War of the Third Coalition

- Part of the Ulm campaign within the War of the Third Coalition
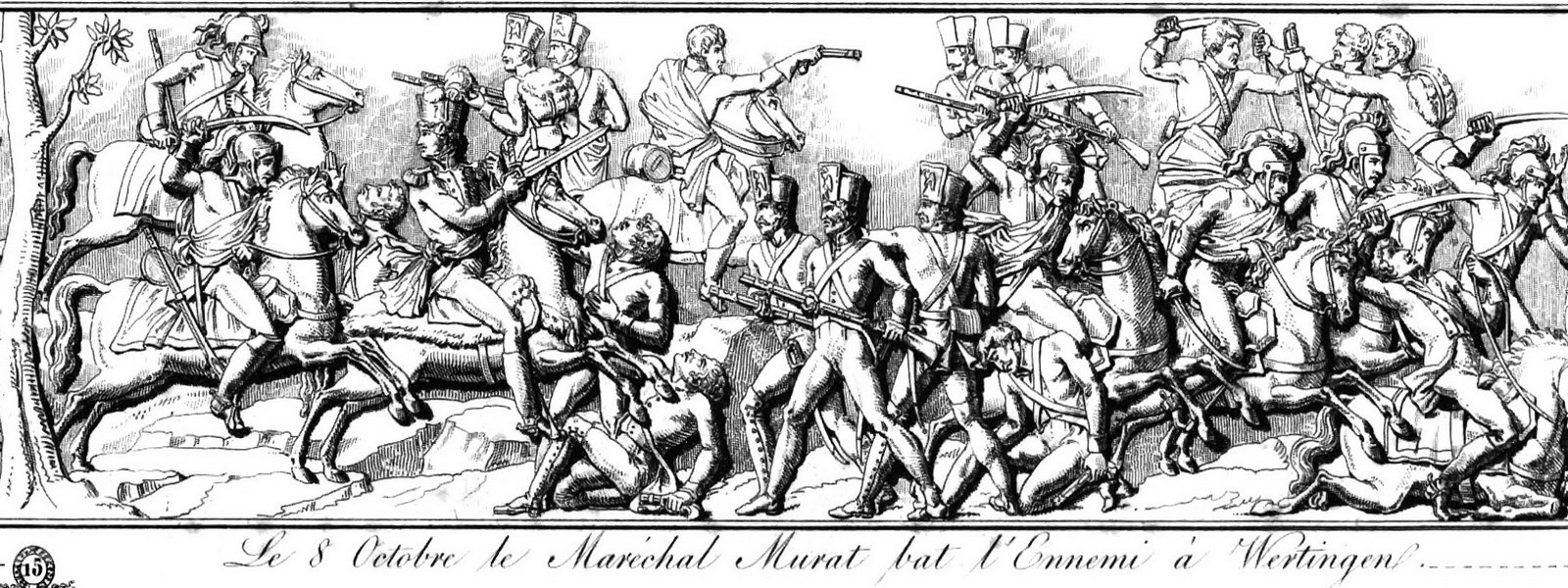
- Bas-relief of the battle from the Column of the Grande Armée
Date	8 October 1805
Location	Wertingen, present-day Germany 48.5556°N 10.6792°E
Result	French victory

Belligerents
(France) First French Empire	Austrian Empire

Commanders and leaders
(France) Joachim Murat (France) Jean Lannes	(Holy Roman Empire) Franz von Auffenberg

Units involved
(France) Cavalry Reserve (France) V Corps	(Holy Roman Empire) Auffenberg's Corps

Strength
12,000	5,500

Casualties and losses
319 killed or wounded	400 killed or wounded 2,900 captured

War of the Third Coalition:
Ulm Campaign
current battle
Napoleon in command
Napoleon not in command

In the Battle of Wertingen (8 October 1805 / 16 vendémiaire an XIV) Imperial French forces led by Marshals Joachim Murat and Jean Lannes attacked a small Austrian corps commanded by Feldmarschall-Leutnant Franz Xaver von Auffenberg. This action, the first battle of the Ulm Campaign, resulted in a clear French victory. Wertingen lies 28 kilometres (17 mi) northwest of Augsburg. The combat was fought during the War of the Third Coalition, part of the Napoleonic Wars.

== Background ==
Emperor Napoleon Bonaparte had launched his 200,000-man Grand Army across the Rhine. This huge mass of maneuver wheeled to the south and crossed the Danube River to the east of (i.e., behind) General Karl Freiherr Mack von Leiberich's concentration at Ulm. Unaware of the force bearing down on him, Mack stayed in place as Napoleon's corps spread south across the Danube, slicing across his lines of communication with Vienna.

== Forces ==
Murat's advance guard included the heavy cavalry divisions of General of Division Louis Klein (16 squadrons of the 1st, 14th, 20th and 26th Dragoon Regiments) and General of Division Marc Antoine de Beaumont (18 squadrons of the 4th, 5th, 8th, 9th, 12th and 16th Dragoons), plus General of Brigade Antoine Lasalle's light cavalry brigade (8 squadrons of 9th and 10th Hussars), a total of 42 squadrons. These were supported by eight battalions of General of Division Nicolas Oudinot's Grenadier division and three battalions of the 28th Light Infantry Regiment.

Auffenberg's command included 26 battalions, 20 cavalry squadrons and 24 guns. Feldmarschall-Leutnant Maximilien de Baillet's division included Infantry Regiments Kaunitz Nr. 20, Archduke Ludwig Nr. 8, Franjo Jelačić Nr. 62, a brigade of four grenadier battalions, Cuirassier Regiment Albert Nr. 3 and Chevau-léger Regiment Rosenberg Nr. 6. Feldmarschall-Leutnant Prince Friedrich Franz Xaver of Hohenzollern-Hechingen's division was made up of Infantry Regiments Spork Nr. 25, Wurttemberg Nr. 38, Reuss-Greitz Nr. 55, Stuart Nr. 18, Hussar Regiment Palatine Nr. 12 and Chevau-léger Regiment Latour Nr. 4.

== Battle ==
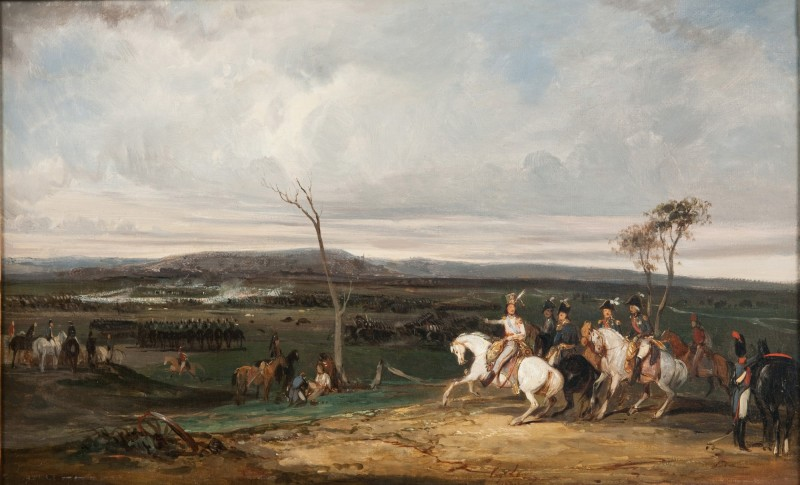
La bataille de Wertingen by E. L. Lami

Apparently because his troops were surprised, Auffenberg seems to have only brought nine battalions and one squadron, about 5,500 men, into action. There are conflicting accounts. One historian talks about individual battalions being broken by cavalry or surrounded and forced to surrender. Another writer says that Austrian grenadiers formed in a massive square which resisted cavalry charges until the French brought up Oudinot's grenadiers.

French losses are stated as 319 killed and wounded. The Austrians suffered 400 killed and wounded, plus 2,900 men and 6 cannons captured. One historian says 2,000 Austrians were captured. Cut off from Vienna, the Austrians retreated westward toward their base at Ulm.

== Commentary ==
One historian remarks, "It is not clear why ... Mack had sent this small force to such an isolated position." He added, "His continual reorganization of the troops on the battlefield sowed confusion and demoralization."

== Footnotes ==
Preceded by Battle of Cape Finisterre (1805)	Napoleonic Wars; Battle of Wertingen	Succeeded by Battle of Haslach-Jungingen
