= Beaumont-la-Ronce =

- Part of Beaumont-Louestault
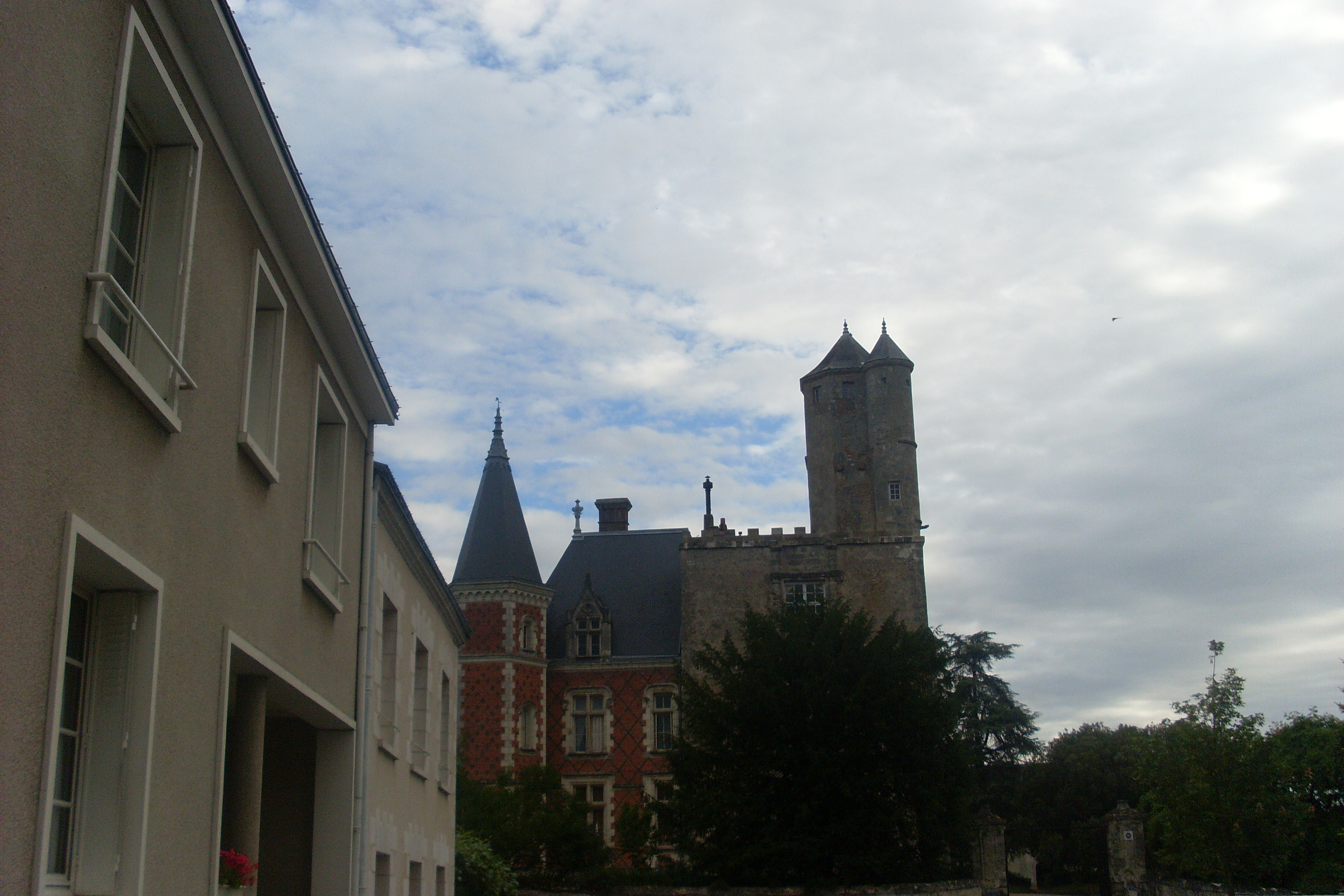
- Chateau
- Location of Beaumont-la-Ronce
- Location within France Location within Centre-Val de Loire
- Coordinates: 47°34′15″N 0°40′19″E
- Country: France
- Region: Centre-Val de Loire
- Department: Indre-et-Loire
- Arrondissement: Tours
- Canton: Château-Renault
- Commune: Beaumont-Louestault
- Area^{1}: 39.04 km^{2} (15.07 sq mi)
- Highest elevation: 175 m (574 ft)
- Lowest elevation: 85 m (279 ft)
- Population (2019): 1,276
  - Density: 32.68/km^{2} (84.65/sq mi)
- Time zone: UTC+01:00 (CET)
  - Summer (DST): UTC+02:00 (CEST)
- Postal code: 37360
- ^{1} French Land Register data, which excludes lakes, ponds, glaciers > 1 km^{2} (0.386 sq mi or 247 acres) and river estuaries.

Beaumont-la-Ronce (French pronunciation: [bomɔ̃ la ʁɔ̃s]) is a former commune in the Indre-et-Loire department in central France. On 1 January 2017, it was merged into the new commune Beaumont-Louestault.

== Population ==
Historical population

Year	Pop.	±% p.a.
1793	1,612	—
1821	1,620	+0.02%
1846	1,440	−0.47%
1872	1,135	−0.91%
1901	1,265	+0.37%
1926	998	−0.94%
1946	941	−0.29%

Year	Pop.	±% p.a.
1962	1,045	+0.66%
1968	1,041	−0.06%
1975	1,046	+0.07%
1982	1,040	−0.08%
1990	901	−1.78%
1999	994	+1.10%
2019	1,276	+1.26%

Source: EHESS and INSEE

== See also ==
- Communes of the Indre-et-Loire department
