= Ulm-Jungingen =

Jungingen
- Stadtteil of Ulm
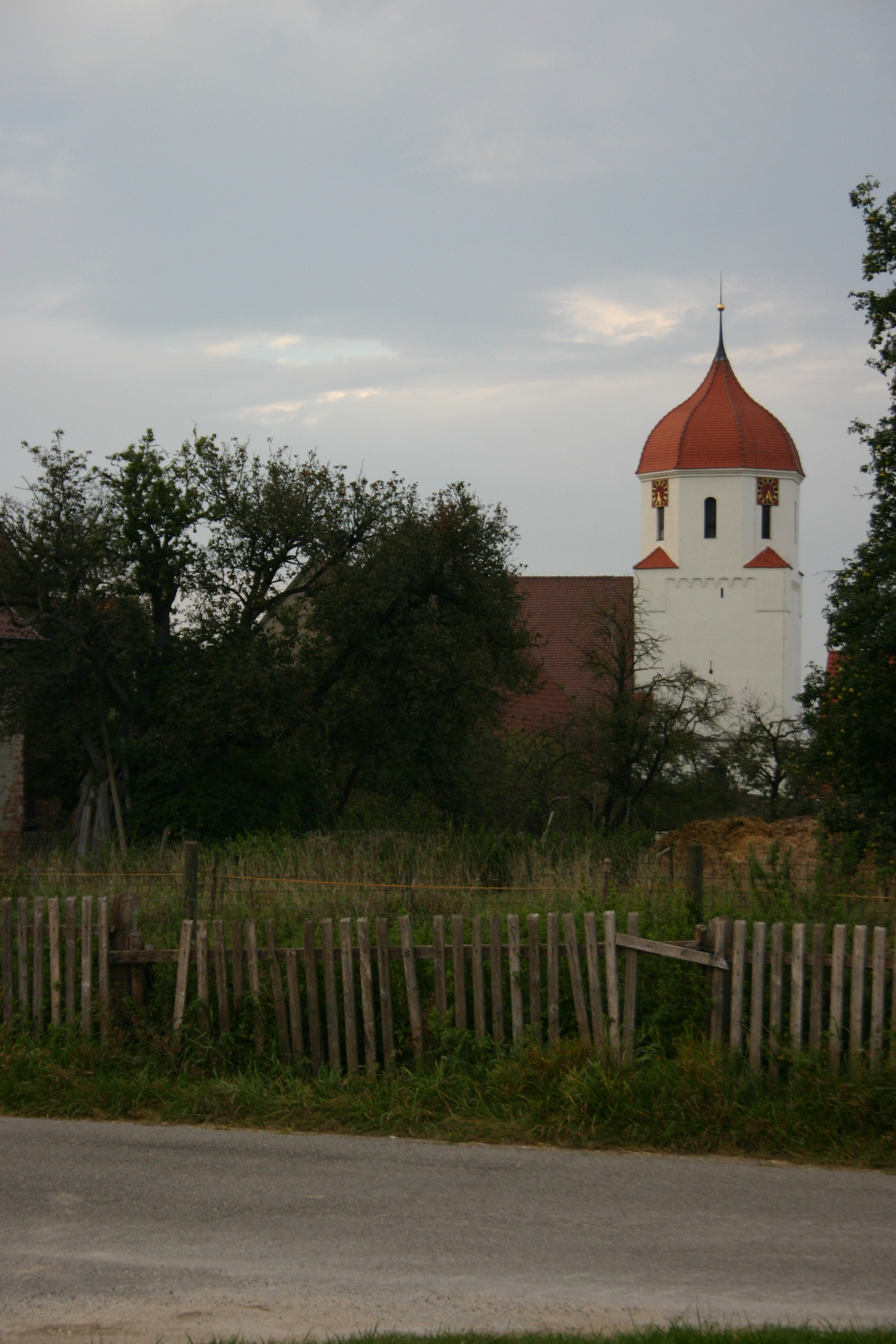
- Protestant church of Jungingen
- Interactive map of Jungingen
- Location within Germany Location within Baden-Württemberg
- Coordinates: 48°27′N 9°59′E
- Country: Germany
- State: Baden-Württemberg
- Admin. region: Tübingen
- District: Urban district
- City: Ulm

Population (2019-12-31)
  - Total: 3,706
- Time zone: UTC+01:00 (CET)
  - Summer (DST): UTC+02:00 (CEST)
- Postal codes: 89081
- Dialling codes: 0731
- Vehicle registration: UL
- Website: www.jungingen.ulm.de

Ulm-Jungingen (German pronunciation: [ˈjʊŋɪŋən]) is a borough of Ulm in the German Bundesland of Baden-Württemberg with a population of 3,706 (2019).

== History ==
Historians suppose that the first settlers arrived circa 700. The ending "ingen" insinuates that Jungingen, like its namesake to the west near the river Neckar, has an alemannic background. Jungingen near the Danube is first mentioned in 1275.

In the 17th century Jungingen was recorded to have had just had about 300 inhabitants. The roofs were thatched, except for the roof of the church.

On 11 October 1805, a part of Napoleon's army met superior Austrian forces which misjudged the situation. The Battle of Haslach-Jungingen was fought until 9 o'clock p.m., when the French troops retreated, with 4000 Austrian prisoners. The casualties were roughly 2000 deaths in total.
