= Battle of Haslach-Jungingen =

1805 Battle during the War of the Third Coalition

- Part of the Ulm campaign within the War of the Third Coalition
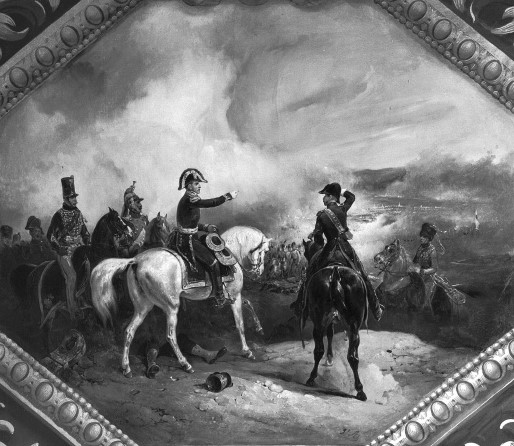
- General Dupont at the Battle of Albeck, 11 October 1805 by Victor Adam, 1834
Date	11 October 1805
Location	Ulm-Jungingen, present-day Germany 48.45°N 10.01°E
Result	French victory

Belligerents
French Empire	Austrian Empire

Commanders and leaders
Pierre Dupont	Karl Mack von Leiberich

Strength
4,000–6,000 (Note: Estimates: • 4,000; • 5,000; • 6,000)	25,000 (in total)

Casualties and losses
1,500 killed, wounded, and captured; • 600 killed or wounded; 11 cannon captured	1,100 killed or wounded 4,000 captured 4 guns and 2 flags

War of the Third Coalition:
Ulm Campaign
current battle
Napoleon in command
Napoleon not in command

The Battle of Haslach-Jungingen, also known as the Battle of Albeck, fought on 11 October 1805 at Ulm-Jungingen north of Ulm at the Danube between French and Austrian forces, was part of the Ulm campaign during the War of the Third Coalition, which was a part of the greater Napoleonic Wars. The Austrians, despite their numerical advantage, were unable to make good use of it due to indecision resulting from an overestimation of the French numbers and the local terrain. The outcome of this battle was a French victory.

== Background ==
During the Ulm Campaign, Napoleon's Grand Army had executed a massive right wheel to trap the Austrian army led by Karl Mack von Lieberich. Starting on the Rhine River, facing east, the various French corps arrived on the Danube River, facing south. From the Danube, using Marshal Michel Ney's VI Corps as a pivot, the Grand Army continued its right wheel until most of Napoleon's corps were facing west. The bulk of the Austrian army was now trapped, though Napoleon did not know exactly where most of the enemy units were located.

The French believed that the Austrian garrison of Ulm formed part of a rearguard, not a large army. Marshal Joachim Murat was placed in command of the VI Corps on the north bank and the V Corps and a large force of cavalry on the south bank. His mission was to drive west toward Ulm.

On 11 October Murat ordered Marshal Michel Ney to move the bulk of his VI Corps to the south bank of the Danube. Ney argued that the north bank force was too small but Murat brushed him off with the comment, "I know nothing of plans except those made in the face of the enemy." Ney reluctantly complied with his orders, leaving only the division of Pierre Dupont on the north bank, supported by Tilly's VI Corps cavalry.

== Battle ==
The battle occurred when Mack and Archduke Ferdinand made an attempt to break out from the French forces that were surrounding them at Ulm. Later that day, Dupont found himself faced with 35,000 Austrian troops, including 10,000 cavalry, which Mack had sent eastward along the bank of the Danube. Dupont felt that retreat would lead to an Austrian pursuit and the destruction of his division, so he chose instead to attack the numerically superior Austrians. He also hoped that he could blunt their attack and at the same time convince them that he had a greater force at his disposal than was in fact the case.

Dupont's 4,100-man 1st Division of the VI Corps was made up of two battalions of 9th Light Infantry and two battalions each of the 32nd and 96th Line Infantry Regiments under Generals of Brigade Jean Rouyer and Jean Marchand. Tilly's cavalry brigade included the 1st Hussar Regiments, plus the 15th and 17th Dragoons. This made a total of 900 horsemen. His nearest support was a division of dragoons under the command of General Louis Baraguey d'Hilliers.

Throughout the day the French were able to launch a series of holding attacks against the Austrian force, the fiercest taking place at the village of Ulm-Jungingen just to the west of Albeck. Here the church was held by the 9th Light. Rouyer fortified the church and sent skirmishers forward to blunt the Austrian attacks. He then sent forward reserve columns that had been held outside the village when the Austrian assault slowed at the church. Mack was unable to make effective use of his massive superiority in cavalry because woods to the north of Dupont’s position protected that general’s flank. As the battle progressed, Field Marshal Mack came to believe that the French troops he was now facing were part of an advance guard, not an isolated group, which prevented him from committing all of his reserves. This blunder allowed Dupont to hold off the Austrians long enough for nightfall to come, at which point he withdrew with his exhausted troops, 6,000 Austrian prisoners and 8 captured cannons toward Brenz. In addition, the Austrians lost 1,100 killed or wounded. Mack was lightly wounded and he withdrew back into Ulm.

The Austrians inflicted a loss of 1,000 killed and captured 2 cannons on Dupont's command. The Austrian Latour Light Dragoons Nr. 4 seized the eagle of the 15th Dragoons.

== Strategic consequences ==
Murat's error gave Mack a great opportunity to break out to the east on the north bank of the Danube. Mack's very weak leadership and Dupont's aggressive response prevented the Austrian army from escaping the trap that Napoleon had set for them. For a few more days, only Dupont and some cavalry blocked the north bank while Mack dithered. After the fighting at Haslach-Jungingen a furious argument broke out between Ney and Murat as to who was responsible for the danger into which Dupont had been placed. Napoleon intervened in this altercation, in the end supporting Ney. On 14 October, at the Battle of Elchingen, Mack tried to break out again, but the rest of Ney's corps attacked across the river to the north bank. This plugged one of Mack's few remaining escape hatches.

== Notes ==
Preceded by Battle of Haslach-Jungingen	Napoleonic Wars; Battle of Elchingen	Succeeded by Battle of Ulm
