= VI Corps (Grande Armée) =

Military unit of Grande Armée

- Active: 1805–1807; 1812–1814; 1815
- Country: First French Empire
- Branch: French Imperial Army
- Size: Corps
- Part of: Grande Armée
- Engagements: War of the Third Coalition; War of the Fourth Coalition; War of the Fifth Coalition; Russian Campaign; War of the Sixth Coalition; War of the Seventh Coalition

Commanders
- Notable commanders: Auguste de Marmont; Georges Mouton; Michel Ney; Laurent Gouvion Saint-Cyr

The VI Corps of the Grande Armée was a French military unit that existed during the Napoleonic Wars. It was formed at the Camp de Boulogne and assigned to Marshal Michel Ney. From 1805 to 1811, the VI Corps fought under Ney's command in the 1805 Austrian Campaign: War of the Third Coalition, Prussian Campaign of 1806 and Polish Campaign of 1807 of the War of the Fourth Coalition. General Jean Gabriel Marchand was in charge of the corps for a period when Ney went on leave. The VI Corps was revived in 1812 for the French invasion of Russia and placed under Marshal Laurent Gouvion Saint-Cyr. It consisted entirely of Bavarian soldiers at that time. During the disastrous retreat from Moscow, the corps was virtually destroyed. In 1813, during the War of the Sixth Coalition, it was rebuilt and reorganized with French troops. Marshal Auguste de Marmont took command of the corps and managed it until Napoleon's abdication in 1814. It took part in many battles including Dresden and Leipzig in 1813. During the War of the Seventh Coalition, General Georges Mouton commanded the VI Corps at the Battle of Waterloo.

== History ==
=== 1805–1807 ===
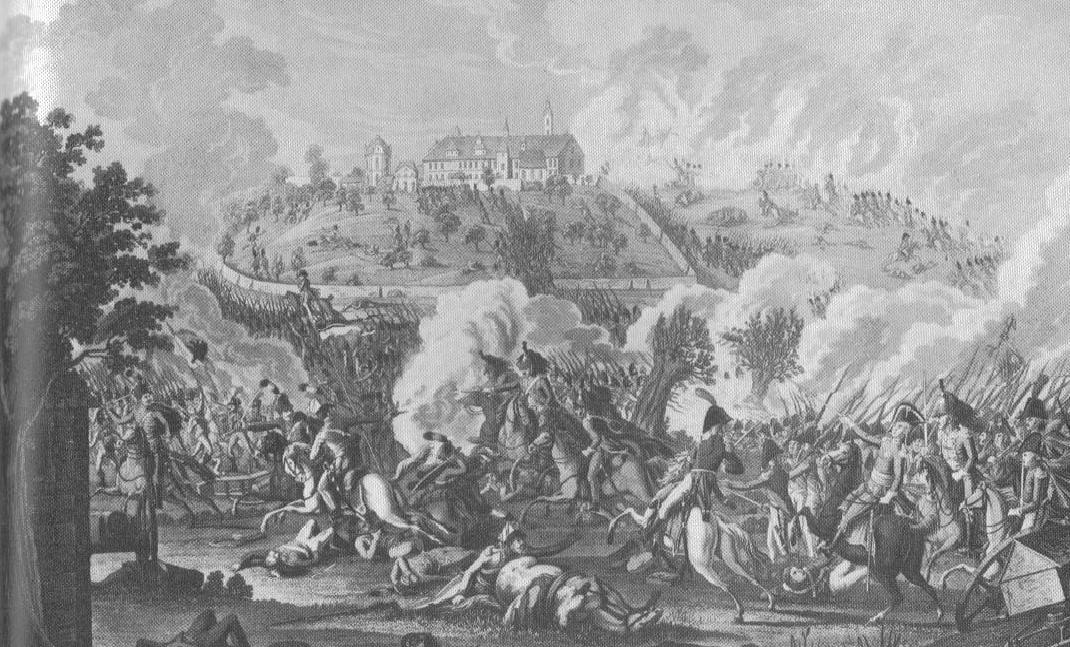
The Battle of Elchingen, engraving by Johann Lorenz Rugendas

Under the command of Ney, the VI Corps crossed the Rhine near Karlsruhe on the evening of 24–25 September, 1805 at the start of the War of the Third Coalition. On 2 October, Napoleon's advancing Grande Armée began to wheel to the right, aiming for the Danube River, with Ney's corps on the right as the pivot. The army reached the Danube near Donauwörth and the troops began to cross to the south bank on 7 October. However, the VI Corps remained on the north bank. On 9 October, Ney's 3rd Division under General Malher defeated the Austrians at the Battle of Günzburg. Two days later, General Pierre Dupont's 1st Division found itself facing 25,000 Austrians in the Battle of Haslach-Jungingen. Surprisingly, the badly outnumbered French fended off the enemy all day, before the discouraged Austrians finally retreated. On 14 October, Ney fought General Johann Sigismund Riesch's small corps at the Battle of Elchingen. Using General Loison's 2nd Division, supported by Malher, Ney crushed Riesch's troops with heavy losses.

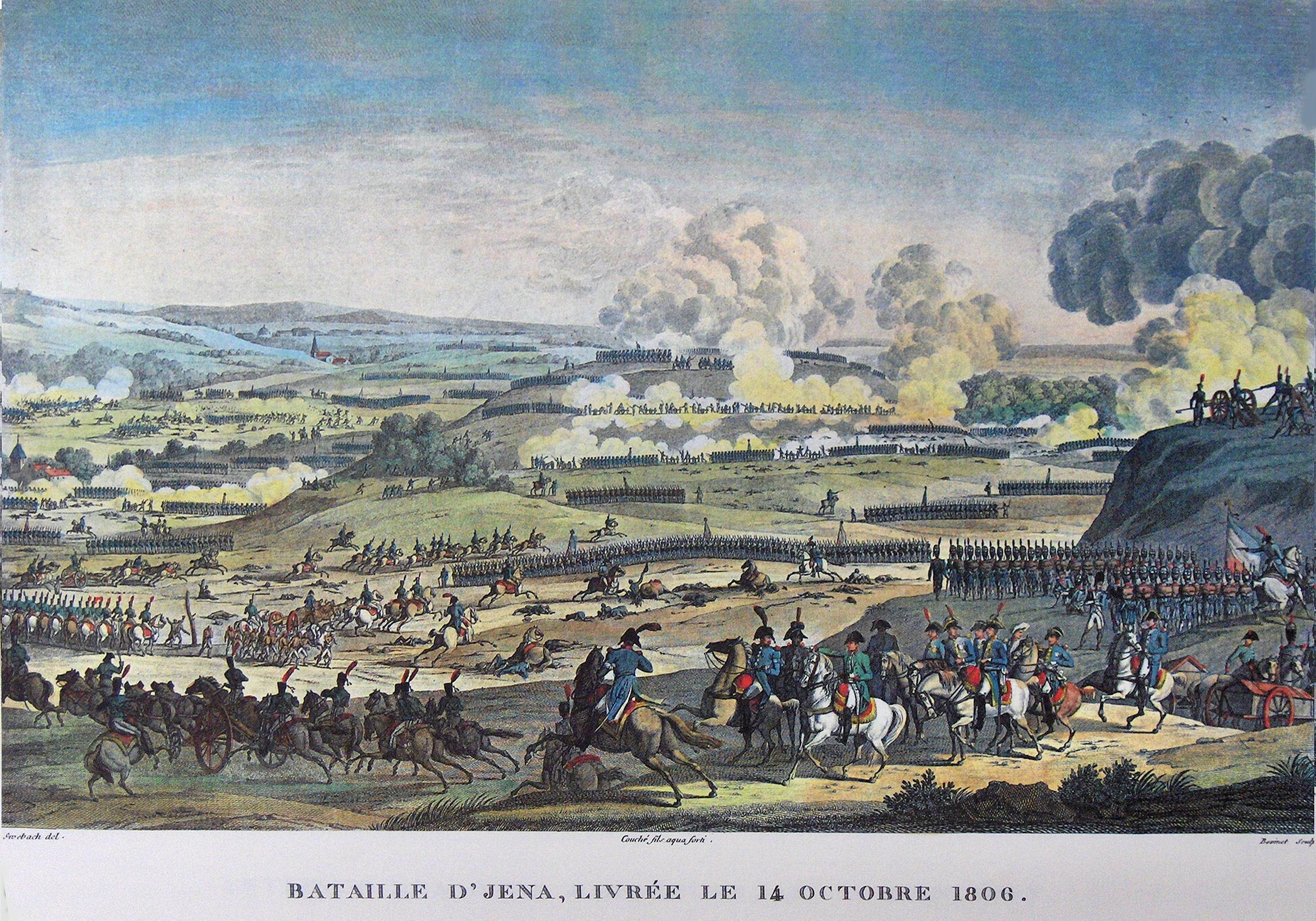
The Battle of Jena, by Carle Vernet

Thereafter, Dupont's division and Jacques Louis François Delaistre de Tilly's VI Corps cavalry assisted Marshal Joachim Murat in the destruction of General Franz von Werneck's Austrian corps. Later, Dupont's division was detached from the corps and fought at the Battle of Dürrenstein on 11 November. With the other two divisions, Ney marched into the Tyrol where one column was repulsed at Scharnitz but a second column captured 900 Austrians at Leutasch. Both actions occurred on 4 November 1805.

The corps fought at the Battle of Jena on 14 October 1806 during the War of the Fourth Coalition. Ney's troops were engaged in the Siege of Magdeburg beginning on 22 October. General Franz Kasimir von Kleist surrendered on 11 November with 22,000 Prussian soldiers, 800 officers, 20 generals, and 700 artillery pieces. On 25 December, Marchand, with 6,000 men and 12 guns, defeated 3,000 Prussians at the Battle of Soldau. The corps arrived at 7:15 PM on 8 February 1807 at the Battle of Eylau. Ney's 17,000 men held off 63,000 Russians in a brilliant rear guard action in the Battle of Guttstadt-Deppen on 5 and 6 June. The corps led the successful counterattack at the Battle of Friedland on 14 June 1807.

=== 1812–1814 ===
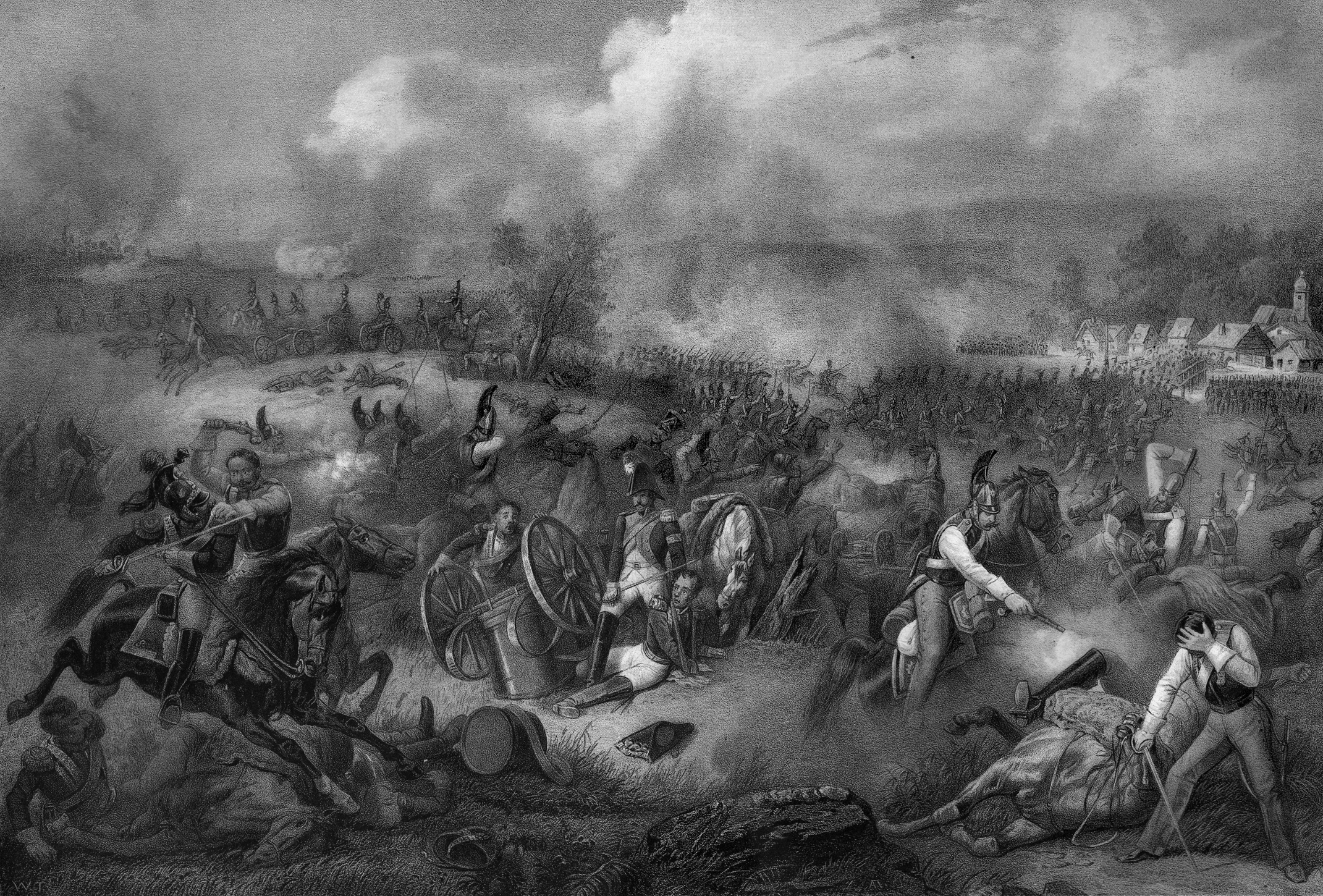
The Battle of Polotsk, 18 August 1812

The VI Corps was reconstituted for the invasion of Russia and placed under the command of General Laurent de Gouvion Saint-Cyr. The corps was composed entirely of Bavarian soldiers. At the First Battle of Polotsk on 16 to 18 August 1812, the Bavarians and the French II Corps together suffered 6,000 casualties, including Bavarian Generals Bernhard Erasmus von Deroy and Siebein killed, and Vincenti and Raglowitsch wounded. Saint-Cyr won his marshal's baton for this costly victory. The corps fought in the Second Battle of Polotsk on 18 to 20 October. This time, the combined Bavarian and French forces sustained 8,000 to 9,000 casualties before withdrawing to the southwest. A body of 2,100 surviving Bavarians was captured at Thorn on 16 April 1813 after a two-month siege.

The corps was rebuilt as a French formation in the spring of 1813. Under Marshal Marmont, the corps fought at the Battle of Lützen on 2 May. The 20th Division under General Compans and the 21st Division under General Jean Pierre François Bonet participated in the engagement. On 20 and 21 May, Marmont led the VI Corps at the Battle of Bautzen. On this occasion, General Friedrichs' 22nd Division joined the other two divisions in the fighting. After the summer armistice expired, the corps fought at the Battle of Dresden on 26 and 27 August. Lagrange replaced Bonet as commander of the 21st Division. During the Battle of Leipzig, Marmont defended the northern sector against Marshal Gebhard Leberecht von Blücher's Prussian forces. After bitter fighting on 16 October, the VI Corps was defeated when the Prussians launched a massed cavalry charge. Two days later, the Württemberger cavalry belonging to the corps defected to the Allies. The formation fought against the Bavarians at the Battle of Hanau on 30 and 31 October.

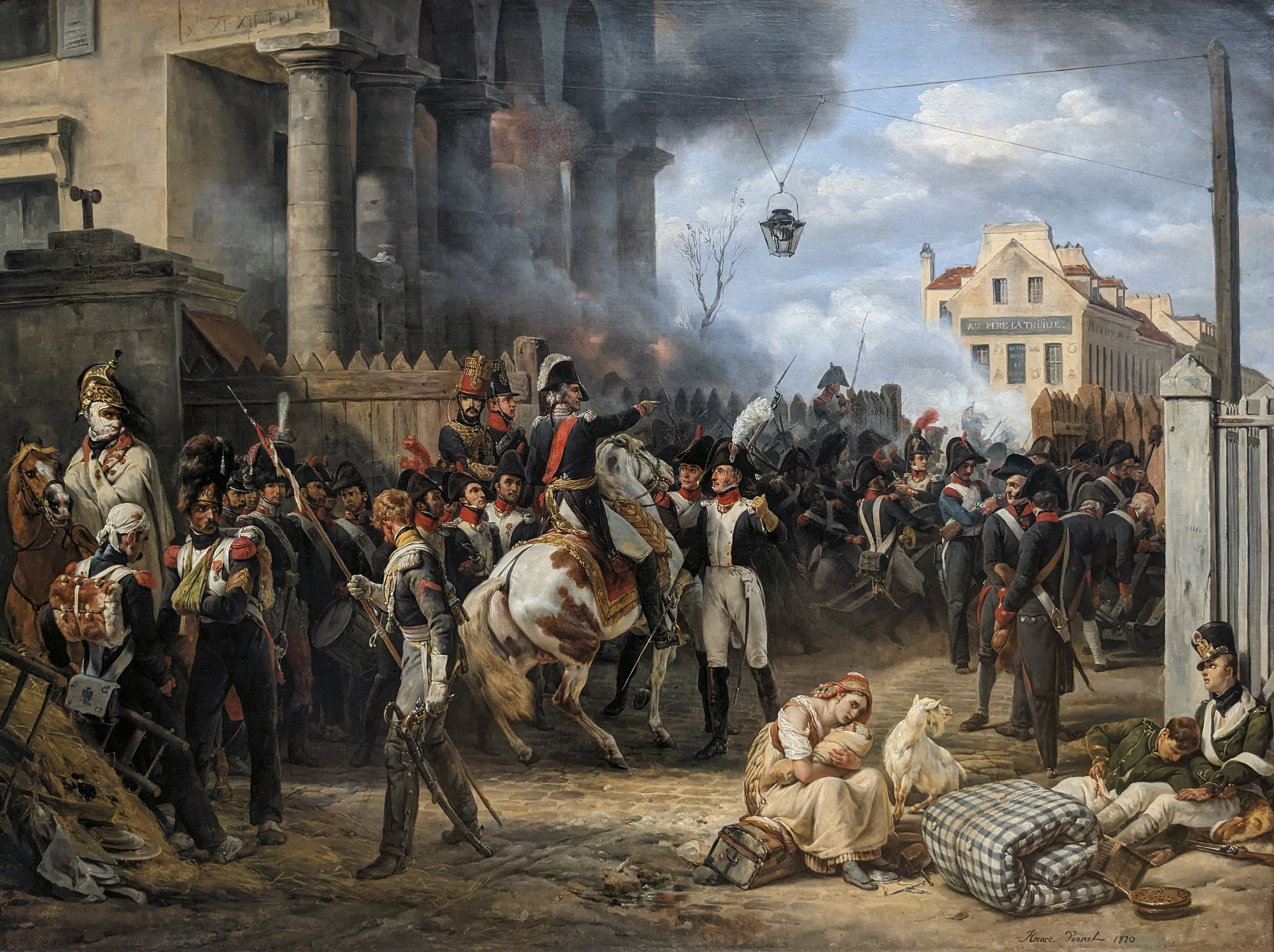
The Battle of Paris, 30 March 1814, by Horace Vernet

The following spring, Marmont led the VI Corps during the Six Days' Campaign. At the Battle of Champaubert on 10 February 1814, they destroyed an understrength Russian corps and captured its commander. Marmont was left to observe part of Blücher's army while Napoleon fell upon the rest. While Marmont capably held off Blücher's advance, Napoleon concentrated his forces behind him. At the Battle of Vauchamps on 14 February, Napoleon attacked Blücher and drove him from the field. In these engagements, Lagrange led the 3rd Division while General Étienne Pierre Sylvestre Ricard directed the 8th Division. Marmont led his men in a minor victory at Gué-à-Tresmes on 28 February. The corps fought again in the Battle of Craonne on 7 March.

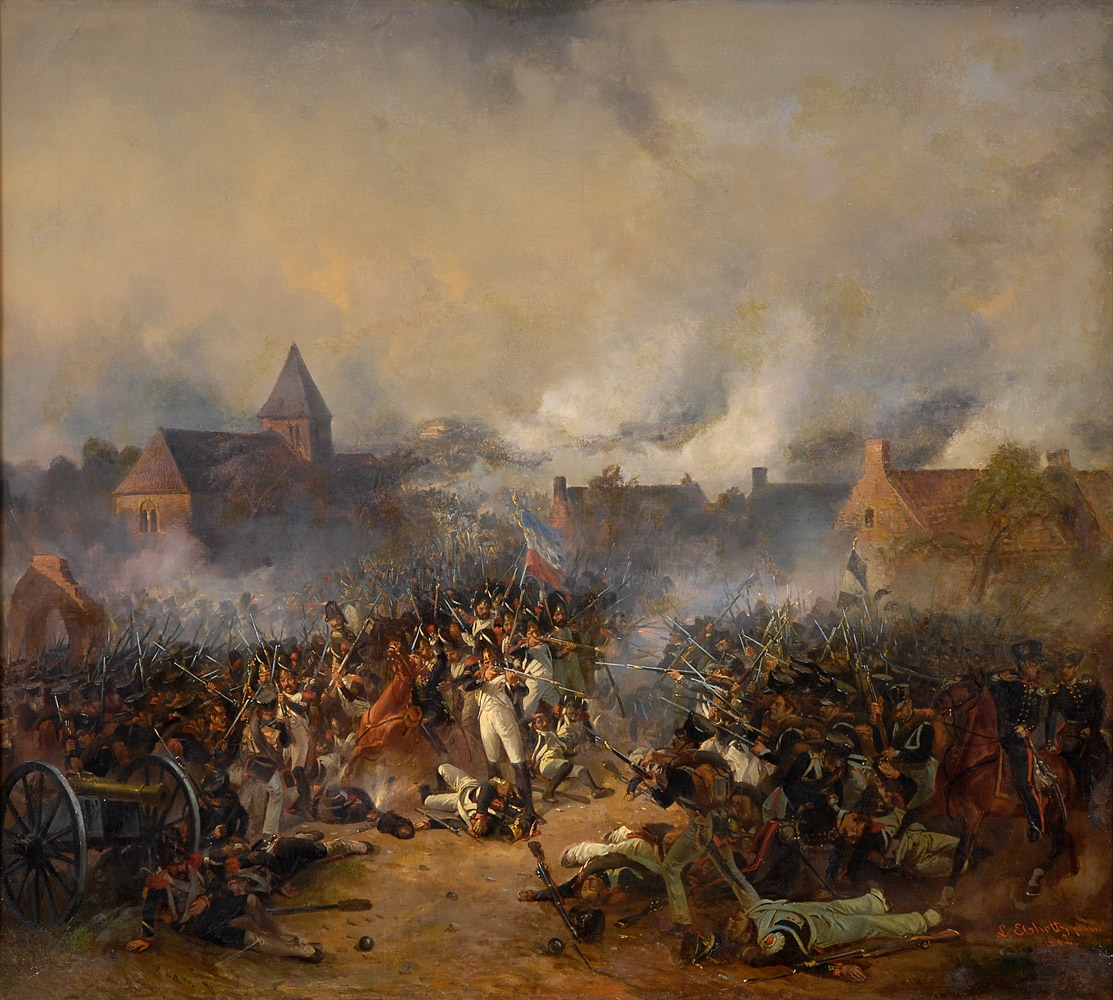
Fighting at Plancenoit during the Battle of Waterloo, 18 June 1815, by Ludwig Elsholtz

At the Battle of Laon on 9 March, the 10,000 troops of the corps arrived in the early afternoon and captured some positions east of Laon. Satisfied, Marmont called off the attack and the troops went into bivouac. Without warning, Blücher launched an attack in the evening, routing the VI Corps. Two pieces of luck allowed Marmont and his men to escape. General Charles Nicolas Fabvier, sent on a mission with 1,000 men, returned to keep the road open. Meanwhile, 125 soldiers of the Old Guard held off waves of Allied cavalry to hold the Festieux defile. At the Battle of Reims on 13 March, Marmont's corps helped recapture the city. At the Battle of Fère-Champenoise on 25 March, the VI Corps and other troops proved unable to stop the advance of the Coalition armies. After the Battle of Paris, the French abandoned the capital to the Allies. By this time, the VI Corps was a mere shadow of its former self. It went into action with Lagrange's 1,395 troops, Ricard's 726 men, and General Jean-Toussaint Arrighi de Casanova's 1,250 soldiers. As a result of the loss of Paris, Napoleon abdicated on 6 April 1814.

=== 1815 ===
During the Hundred Days, Napoleon reconstituted the corps and appointed Mouton as its commander. The corps arrived in the evening after the Battle of Ligny on 16 June 1815 and camped close to the Prussian outposts. The next day, Napoleon ordered Mouton to march his corps west to a position where it could attack Wellington's British army and attached General Subervie's light cavalry division. At the same time, General Teste's division was detached from the corps to operate with Marshal Emmanuel de Grouchy's right wing.

On the morning of the 18th at the Battle of Waterloo, Napoleon placed the VI Corps in the second line, with the divisions of Generals Simmer and Jeanin one behind the other just to the west of the Charleroi to Brussels highway. When the approach of the Prussian Army was detected, Lobau's two divisions were moved to the east flank, behind the division of General Durutte and facing east. At about 4:00 PM, General von Bülow gave the order to attack and Lobau found himself outnumbered three-to-one by the Prussians. He quickly shifted his position to occupy Plancenoit with his right flank brigade while the rest of his infantry and the light cavalry divisions of Generals Subervie and Domon covered the left flank. This was the start of a brutal fight for the village. When the Prussians began to overrun the village, the 4,200-strong Young Guard arrived and drove them out. As the reinforced Prussians again began to press forward, 1,100 soldiers of the Old Guard attacked and recaptured Plancenoit. This triumph helped Lobau's troops hold the line north of the village. Eventually, the Prussians cleared the village in vicious no-quarter fighting that went on into the evening. Unaware that Napoleon's army was routed at Waterloo, Teste's detached division attacked and captured the hamlet of Bierges on the morning of the 19th during the Battle of Wavre. This local success forced the Prussian III Corps to retreat.

== Order of battle ==
=== Ulm: September 1805 ===
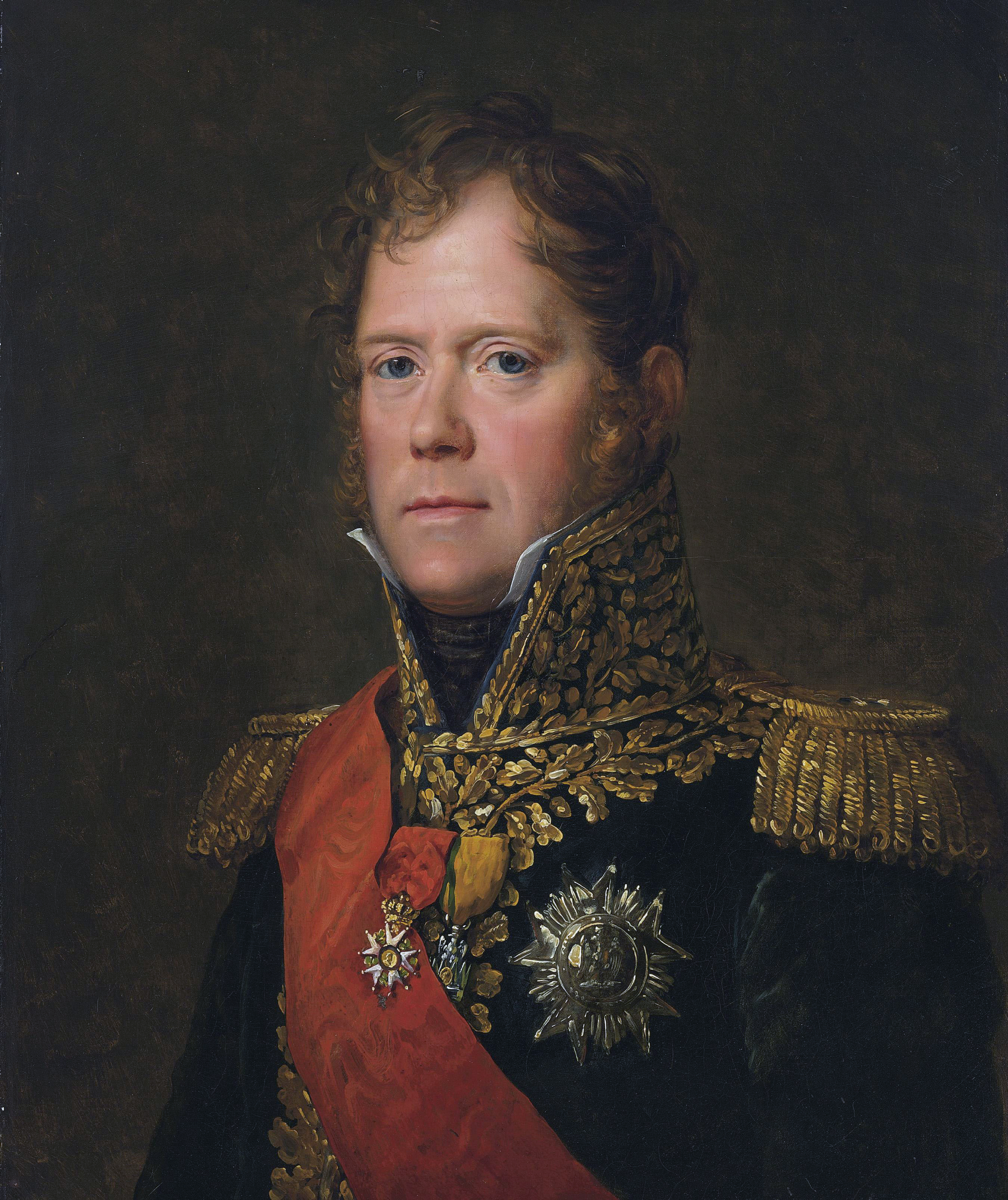
Marshal Michel Ney commanded the VI Corps from 1805 to 1811.

Marshal Michel Ney

- 1st Division: General of Division Pierre Dupont de l'Etang
  - Brigadiers: Generals of Brigade Marie François Rouyer, Jean Gabriel Marchand
    - 9th Light Infantry Regiment (3 battalions)
    - 32nd Line Infantry Regiment (4 battalions)
    - 96th Line Infantry Regiment (4 battalions)
- 2nd Division: General of Division Louis Henri Loison
  - Brigadiers: Generals of Brigade Eugene-Casimir Villatte, François Roguet
    - 6th Light Infantry Regiment (2 battalions)
    - 39th Line Infantry Regiment (2 battalions)
    - 69th Line Infantry Regiment (2 battalions)
    - 76th Line Infantry Regiment (2 battalions)
- 3rd Division: General of Division Jean-Pierre Firmin Malher
  - Brigadiers: Generals of Brigade Mathieu Delabassé, Pierre-Louis Binet de Marcognet
    - 25th Light Infantry Regiment (3 battalions)
    - 27th Line Infantry Regiment (2 battalions)
    - 50th Line Infantry Regiment (2 battalions)
    - 59th Line Infantry Regiment (2 battalions)
- Cavalry Brigade: General of Division Jacques Louis François Delaistre de Tilly
  - 1st Hussar Regiment (3 squadrons)
  - 26th Chasseurs-à-Cheval Regiment (3 squadrons)
- Corps Artillery: unknown commander

Source: Smith (1998, pp. 203–204)

=== Jena: October 1806 ===
VI Corps Commander: Marshal Michel Ney (19,267 men, 24 guns), Chief of Staff: General of Brigade Adrien Jean Baptiste Dutaillis
Division	Brigade	Regiment	Btns/Sqdns/Comps
1st Division: General of Division Jean Gabriel Marchand	Brigade: General of Brigade Eugène-Casimir Villatte	6th Light Infantry Regiment	1st and 2nd
1st Division: General of Division Jean Gabriel Marchand	Brigade: General of Brigade François Roguet	39th Line Infantry Regiment	1st and 2nd
1st Division: General of Division Jean Gabriel Marchand	Brigade: General of Brigade François Roguet	69th Line Infantry Regiment	1st and 2nd
1st Division: General of Division Jean Gabriel Marchand	Brigade: General of Brigade François Roguet	76th Line Infantry Regiment	1st and 2nd
2nd Division: General of Division Gaspard Amédée Gardanne	Brigade: General of Brigade Pierre-Louis Binet de Marcognet	25th Light Infantry Regiment	1st and 2nd
2nd Division: General of Division Gaspard Amédée Gardanne	Brigade: General of Brigade Mathieu Delabassé	27th Line Infantry Regiment	1st and 2nd
2nd Division: General of Division Gaspard Amédée Gardanne	Brigade: General of Brigade Mathieu Delabassé	50th Line Infantry Regiment	1st and 2nd
2nd Division: General of Division Gaspard Amédée Gardanne	Brigade: General of Brigade Mathieu Delabassé	59th Line Infantry Regiment	1st and 2nd
Corps Cavalry	Brigade: General of Brigade Auguste François-Marie de Colbert-Chabanais	10th Chasseurs à Cheval Regiment	1st, 2nd, 3rd, 4th
Corps Cavalry	Brigade: General of Brigade Auguste François-Marie de Colbert-Chabanais	3rd Hussar Regiment	1st, 2nd, 3rd, 4th
Corps Artillery; 1,323 gunners and train	Artillery: 4 12-pound cannons 12 8-pound cannons 4 4-pound cannons 4 6-inch howitzers	1st Foot Artillery Regiment	9th, 10th, 11th, 12th
Corps Artillery; 1,323 gunners and train	Artillery: 4 12-pound cannons 12 8-pound cannons 4 4-pound cannons 4 6-inch howitzers	2nd Horse Artillery Regiment	1st and 5th

Source: Chandler (2005, p. 36)

=== Polotsk: August 1812 ===
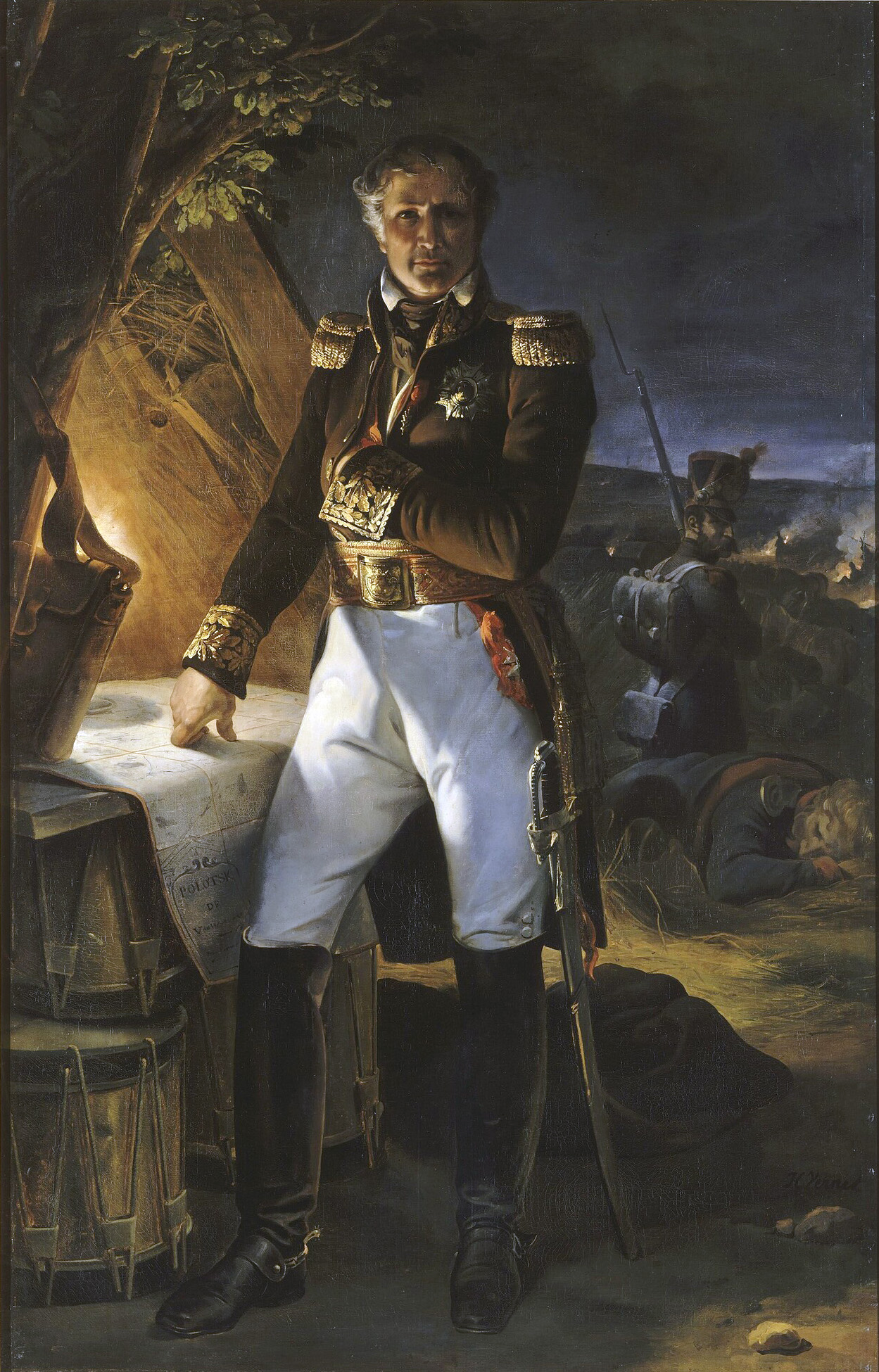
Marshal Laurent de Gouvion Saint-Cyr commanded the corps in Russia.

General of Division Laurent de Gouvion Saint-Cyr (23,228 infantry in 28 battalions)

- 19th (Bavarian) Division: General-Leutnant Bernhard Erasmus von Deroy †
  - 1st Light Infantry Battalion
  - 1st Line Infantry Regiment (2 battalions)
  - 9th Line Infantry Regiment (2 battalions)
  - 3rd Light Infantry Battalion
  - 4th Line Infantry Regiment (2 battalions)
  - 10th Line Infantry Regiment (2 battalions)
  - 6th Light Infantry Battalion
  - 8th Line Infantry Regiment (2 battalions)
- 20th (Bavarian) Division: General-Leutnant Karl Philipp von Wrede
  - 2nd Line Infantry Regiment (2 battalions)
  - 6th Line Infantry Regiment (2 battalions)
  - 4th Light Infantry Battalion
  - 3rd Line Infantry Regiment (2 battalions)
  - 7th Line Infantry Regiment (2 battalions)
  - 5th Light Infantry Battalion
  - 5th Line Infantry Regiment (2 battalions)
  - 11th Line Infantry Regiment (2 battalions)
- Cavalry: (1,906 in 16 squadrons)
- Artillery: (55 guns)

Source: Chandler (1966, p. 1111); Smith (1998, p. 386)

=== Leipzig: October 1813 ===
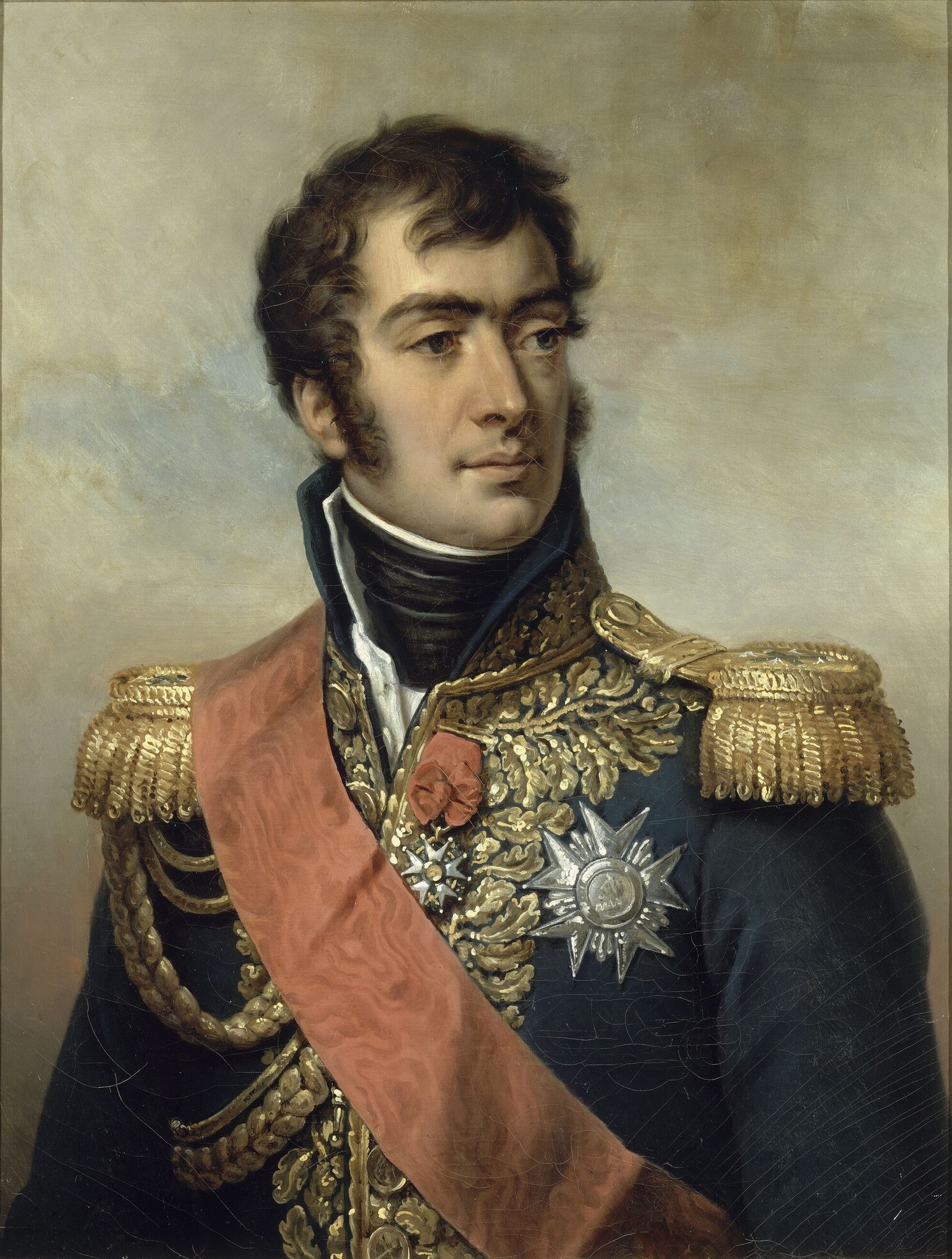
Marshal Auguste Marmont led the VI Corps in 1813 and 1814.

Marshal Auguste de Marmont

- 20th Division: General of Division Jean Dominique Compans (5,079)
  - Brigade: General of Brigade Pierre Pelleport
    - 32nd Light Infantry Regiment (2 battalions)
    - 1st Naval Artillery Regiment (Imperial Naval Corps) (5 battalions)
  - Brigade: Joseph-Antoine-René Joubert
    - 3rd Naval Artillery Regiment (Imperial Naval Corps) (3 battalions)
    - 20th Provisional Demi-Brigade (2 battalions)
    - 25th Provisional Demi-Brigade (2 battalions)
  - Artillery: Two foot artillery batteries (16 guns)
- 21st Division: General of Division Joseph Lagrange (5,543)
  - Brigade: Charles-Joseph Buquet
    - 2nd Naval Artillery Regiment (Imperial Naval Corps) (6 battalions)
  - Brigade: Jean Baptiste Jamin
    - 37th Light Infantry Regiment (4 battalions)
    - 4th Naval Artillery Regiment (Imperial Naval Corps) (3 battalions)
    - Joseph Napoleon's Regiment (1 battalion)
  - Artillery: Two foot artillery batteries (16 guns)
- 22nd Division: General of Division Jean Parfait Friedrichs (4,720)
  - Brigade: Claude Gabriel de Choisy
    - 70th Line Infantry Regiment (2 battalions)
    - 121st Line Infantry Regiment (2 battalions)
    - 16th Provisional Demi-Brigade (2 battalions)
  - Brigade: Louis Jacques de Coehorn
    - 23rd Light Infantry Regiment (2 battalions)
    - 15th Line Infantry Regiment (2 battalions)
    - 11th Provisional Demi-Brigade (2 battalions)
    - 13th Provisional Demi-Brigade (2 battalions)
  - Artillery: Two foot artillery batteries (16 guns)
- 25th Cavalry Brigade: General-Major von Normann (935) – Kingdom of Württemberg
  - Life Light Horse Regiment Nr. 2 (4 squadrons)
  - King's Mounted Jägers Nr. 4 (4 squadrons)
  - Artillery: One horse artillery battery (6 guns)
- Artillery reserve: General of Division Louis François Foucher de Careil
  - 16 × 12-pounder guns in two foot artillery batteries
  - 12 × 6-pounder guns in one horse and one foot artillery batteries

Source: Operational Studies Group (1979); Smith (1998, p. 463)

=== Waterloo: June 1815 ===
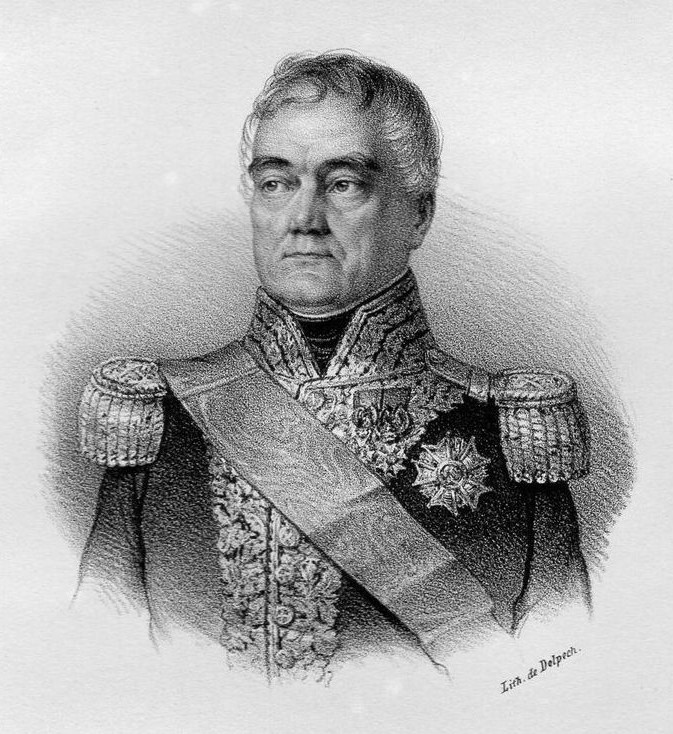
General Georges Mouton commanded the VI Corps at Waterloo.

General of Division Georges Mouton, Count of Lobau

- 19th Division: General of Division François Martin Valentin Simmer
  - 1st Brigade: General of Brigade Antoine Alexandre Julienne de Bellair
    - 5th Line Infantry Regiment
    - 11th Line Infantry Regiment
  - 2nd Brigade: General of Brigade Jean Baptiste Auguste Marie Jamin de Bermuy †
    - 27th Line Infantry Regiment
    - 84th Line Infantry Regiment
- 20th Division: General of Brigade Jean-Baptiste Jeanin
  - 1st Brigade: General of Brigade François Bony
    - 5th Light Infantry Regiment
    - 10th Line Infantry Regiment
  - 2nd Brigade: General of Brigade Jacques Jean Marie François Boudin Tromelin
    - 107th Line Infantry Regiment
- 21st Division: General of Division François Antoine Teste
  - 1st Brigade: General of Brigade Michel-Pascal Lafitte
    - 8th Light Infantry Regiment
  - 2nd Brigade: General of Brigade Raymond-Pierre Penne †
    - 65th Line Infantry Regiment
    - 75th Line Infantry Regiment
- Artillery: General of Division Henri Marie Lenoury
  - Four foot artillery batteries
  - One horse artillery battery
