= French Imperial Naval Corps =

Former infantry corps of the French Navy

- Corps des Marines Impériaux
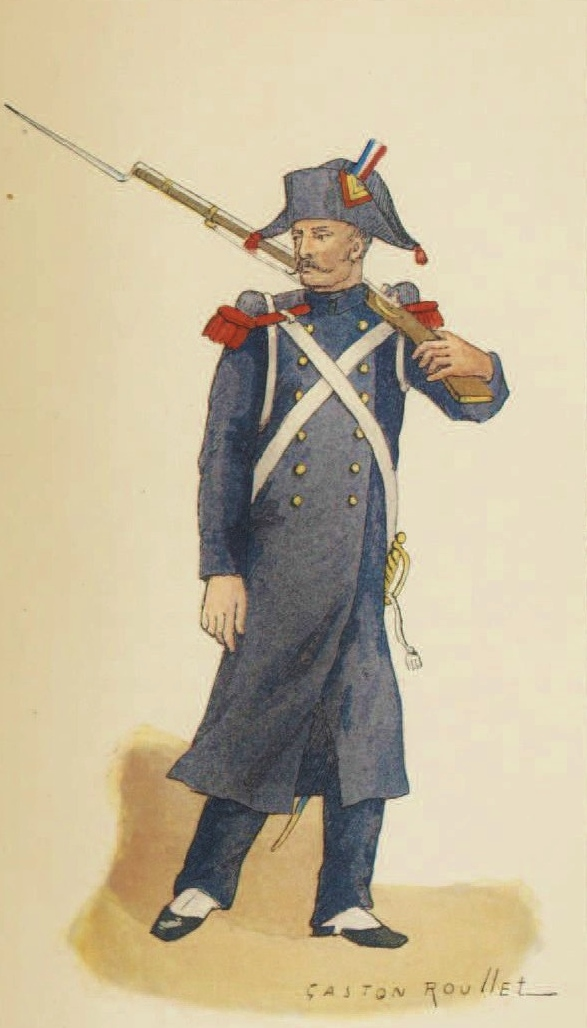
- Soldat of the Naval Artillery during the 1813 campaign. This soldat is in 'campaign dress'. It was in-fact this uniform which many Allied soldiers mistook for the uniform of the Imperial Guard
- Active: 1792 – 1804; 1804 – 1814; 1815
- Country: First French Republic (France) French Empire
- Branch: (France) French Navy (France) French Imperial Navy
- Type: Naval troops
- Role: Varies based on unit
- Navy Headquarters: Hôtel de la Marine, Paris
- Engagements: Napoleonic Wars; War of the Third Coalition; Battle of Trafalgar; War of the Fifth Coalition; Peninsular War; Russian Campaign; War of the Sixth Coalition; German Campaign; Battle of Lützen; Battle of Bautzen; Battle of Dresden; Battle of Leipzig; Battle of Hanau; French Campaign; Battle of Meaux; Battle of Paris

The French Imperial Naval Corps (French: Corps des Marines Impériaux) was the branch of the French Imperial Navy responsible for administering the infantry and artillery which was tasked with manning and utilising the weapons on the Navy's ships. The corps comprised two 'official' branches, Naval Infantry and Naval Artillery and one 'unofficial branch' (Coastal Artillery). The Naval Infantry and Naval Artillery formed the 'official' branches as they were under the direct control of the navy and Naval corps. However, the Coastal Artillery was de facto an 'unofficial' branch, as it remained under control of the army for operational duties, while administration and supply was given to the Navy (those troops defending the naval bases were under control of the naval artillery).

== Background ==
The Royal Corps of Cannoneers-Sailors was disbanded on 14 June 1792. On the same day, four regiments of Naval Infantry and two regiments of Naval Artillery were decreed to be raised, which signalled the end of the 'soldier-sailor' experiment, which had seen sailors trained as artillery and infantry. Personnel from the cannoneers-sailors and the colonial artillery were to be incorporated into the new organisation. Each regiment had two battalions of eight companies, each having 87 men and three officers, for a total of 2,880 officers and men plus staff. The establishment strength was obviously never reached since some of the colonial artillery corps continued to exist until absorbed into the army as the 8th Artillery Regiment in 1793.

By decree of 28 January 1794, the Naval artillery and infantry regiments were abolished and absorbed into battalions of the National Volunteers, which were to provide the sea-soldiers for the ships of the Republic. This measure was applied gradually during 1794, but appears to have achieved little beyond a certain amount of chaos as infantrymen who had never been to sea were suddenly told to be naval gunners, while the sea-soldiers resented the abolition of their corps.

== Naval Infantry ==
=== Revolution ===
Under the reorganisation of the naval corps in 1793, the four naval infantry regiments each had an establishment of two battalions of nine companies of 80 men each, including one of grenadiers. The establishment of 1,440 men may have been augmented, since the 4th Naval Infantry Regiment for example with 1,504 men at sea out of a total of 2,089 in early 1794. The uniform of the sailors was a dark blue coat and breeches with dark blue lapels, cuffs, and shoulder straps piped with red; red waistcoat, collar, cuff flaps, and turnbacks piped with white; the turnbacks also had white anchors. Hats were bicornes with red pom-pom or a fatigue cap. White or black gaiters were worn with black accoutrements and a cartridge box with a brass anchor badge; buttons were also brass. There were, however, difficulties in the issue of clothing and equipment to some of the men of the Naval units.

Following the disbandment of the naval infantry in 1794, there was no naval infantry to speak of. Even after the 1795 reformation of the artillery, the infantry were still non-existent.

=== Fleet dilemma ===
Napoleon found himself with weak and demoralised remnants of the high-seas fleet and flotilla. The Boulogne Flotilla crews had been organised into 14 battalions on 10 August 1805. This time, however, the flotilla was not disbanded and its better gunboats were used for coastal service, escorting convoys of small commercial vessels along the Channel. Gunboat No. 88 for instance had a crew 60 sailors with 15 fusiliers detached from a line infantry regiment.

=== 1808 reorganisation ===
One of the main problems of the French Imperial Navy after ship procurement was that of manpower. There were not enough sailors, and in Napoleon's view they should have had military training. He also did not with to see again the undisciplined mobs who had formed the crews of some ships in the days of the Revolution. His solution was clear and simple: militarise the sailors. This would seem quite normal today, but it was almost a heresy in his day.

On 2 March 1808 Napoleon ordered the formation of 50 Battalions of Imperial Sailors (Bataillones de la Marine Impériale), each battalion assigned to man a ship of the line or two frigates. It was a radical step. Each battalion was numbered and had 500 officers and men (divided into four companies of 120 each plus staff). Each sailor was issued with a distinctive uniform, a musket, a bayonet, and accoutrements. The battalions were organised to accommodate about 150 conscripts as apprentice sailors. There was considerable grumbling at first among the officers, but they came around as they realised the benefits of having better-trained crews. On 7 April 1808 all the crews of the flotilla gunboats were also formed into Flotilla Battalions (Bataillons de Flotille). Probably in order to avoid confusion and give more naval names, the battalions were renamed as the High Seas Crews (Équipages de Haut-Bord) and Flotilla Crews (Éqipages de Flotille) in 1810. The list of High Seas Crews according to a despatch from Napoleon to the Minister of Navy and the Colonies Denis, Comte de Decrès were as follows in July 1810: 1st, 2nd, 3rd, 16th, 19th, and 21st Crews in Toulon; 4th (Note: 461 (approximatively four companies) detached to the Army of Spain.), 5th, 6th, 8th, 13th, 15th (Note: 15th had the majority of its force on board ships of the East Indies Squadron while the crew's depot was based in Rochefort still.), and 17th Crews in Rochefort; 11th and 12th Crews in Lorient; 14th and 32nd Crews in Brest; 31st Crews in Le Havre; 33rd, 34th, 35th, 36th, 37th, 38th, 39th, and 40th Crews with the Escaut Squadron in Antwerp.

=== Later years ===
The four companies of the 4th Crew Battalion were ordered to be withdrawn from Spain, but the 44th and 45th Crews were later sent to Spain in turn, serving from 1810 to 1813. Detachments from some of the crews also served in Germany and Austria during the 1809 campaign, more as soldiers assisting the artillery rather than sailors. Napoleon's was concept was that sailors could also be marines if need be, with military training.

In 1811, the establishment of the crews grew to 63 battalions, of which 18 were in the Mediterranean Fleet, including three with the Venice Squadron, seven with the Rochefort Squadron, four with the Lorient Squadron, two with the Brest Fleet, three with the Cherbourg Squadron, 22 with the Escaut Squadron, and seven with the Dutch Squadron. There were also 22 Flotilla Crews, including two Dutch, for a total of 85 Crews totalling 59,000 men.

By 1812, there were 76 High Seas Crews and 24 Flotilla Crews. On 28 March 1813, the flotilla crews were ordered to be abolished and their men incorporated into the High Seas Crews, although this does not appear to have been completely carried out. In any even, the total number of crews now reached 110. Each crews' strength was not between 700 and 900 men each. In round figured, this meant an establishment of 100,000 men for the navy. While this figure was probably never reached, it shows a considerable increase in strength since 1808 and Napoleon's determination to rebuild the French Imperial Navy.

The majority of the crews and rebuilt ships never sailed out of their harbours to break the Royal Navy's blockade of French ports, as the fleet was still not strong enough for significant actions. Instead, as enemies of France approaches on land from the east, the sailors were called to fight the invaders. The 1813 conscripts for the navy went to the army instead, while others were detached to reinforce the battalions of pontonniers and workers in Italy and Germany. In January 1814, each High Seas Crews was instructed to send a 120-man company of sailors-gunners to serve with the army. Some, such as the company of the 9th Crew, took part in the last battles right up to the Battle of Paris. Following the exile of Napoleon the new government of Louis XVIII disbanded the High Seas Crews and went back to the old ways.

Napoleon returned to France from Elba in 1815 and on 24 April decreed the formation of 40 High Seas Crews. Each was now organised like the infantry, now with four companies of fusiliers, one of grenadiers, and one of voltigeurs. Two Crews formed a 'Naval Regiment'. But many of these crews were never raised before the Battle of Waterloo in June. Toulon only had time to form the 17th Naval Regiment before the orders came to disband the crews. None of the crews were in action during the Hundred Days, except for minor incidents such as the 9th Naval Regiment's retaking of Fort-la-Latte from Royalists near Saint-Malo.

== Naval Artillery ==
=== Revolution ===
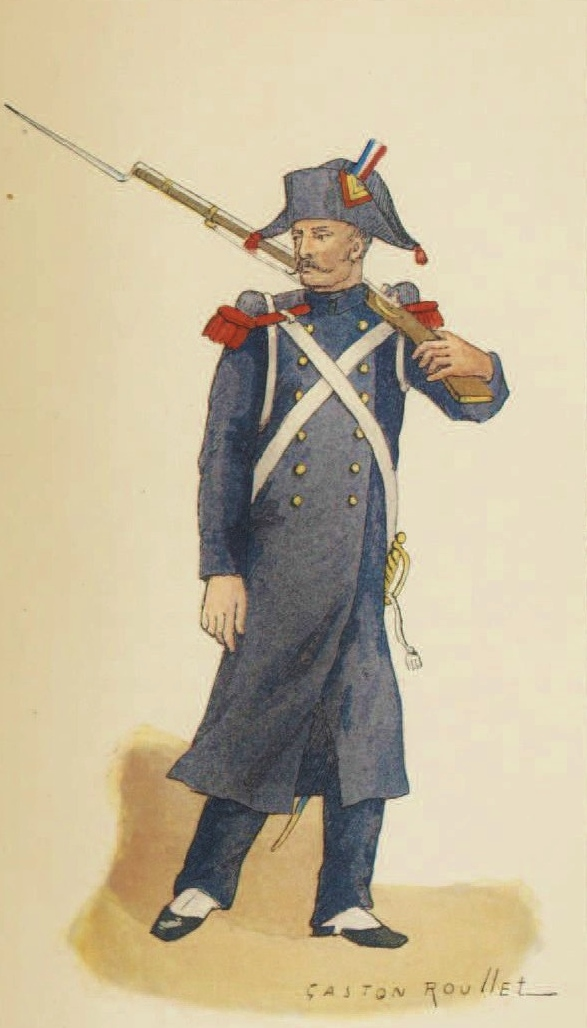
Private of the Naval Artillery in campaign dress in 1813. Judging by the uniform, this is not a member of the Imperial Guard sailors.

The uniform of the naval artillery regiments was dark blue coat, lapels, waistcoat, and breeches with red collar, cuffs, epaulettes, and turnbacks, and red piping edging the lapels, waistcoat, and short gaiters. Buttoners were brass. Headdress was a bicorne and/or the Tarleton-type crested helmet (casque).

Naval gunners participated in several actions, but some in Toulon rallied to the Royalist/Federalist cause following the occupation of that port by the First Coalition in August 1793. During the ensuing siege by French Republican forces, there were naval artillerymen on both sides; the gunners of the Republican being commanded by a certain Captain Napoleon Bonaparte. Coalition forces evacuated Toulon in December, but many French warships were lost. The Toulon arsenal was set aflame by British forces, but Royalist naval gunners extinguished the flames, an action which saved the lives of many of them when they surrendered to the victorious French Republican forces. At the Brest Arsenal, the naval artillerymen were sent to serve as infantry during the Vendée Revolt, replacing them on the ships was the 'National Volunteers' who knew nothing of artillery – an outstanding example of the typical mismanagement of the French Republicans.

During the Siege of Toulon, the naval artillery provided 77 troops to the Republican artillery command, 295 troops spread throughout the front, and 39 troops in the eastern division.

On 25 October 1795, the government recognised its mistake in the National Volunteers sea-soldiers scheme, and decreed the formation of a corps of Naval Artillery of seven demi-brigades (the new title given to regiments), each having three battalions of nine companies, each company having 120 men. This gave the new corps a maximum establishment of over 22,000, not counting the officers. There were three demi-brigades based in Brest, one in Lorient, one at Rochefort, and two at Toulon.

The uniform of the seven demi-brigades was a dark blue coat, lapels, cuffs, turnbacks, waistcoat, and breeches; red collar piped white, red cuff flaps, red piping edging the lapels, cuffs, and turnbacks; yellow metal buttons; bicorne hat; black accoutrements; musket and bayonet. Epaulettes and rank distinctions were the same as in the land artillery. A hanger was worn only by the Non-Commissioned Officers and First Class gunners. There was also a dark blue paletot, linen pantaloons, and an undress cap for fatigue duties, and 'all artillery and infantry drills'. Officers had a similar uniform, but with gilded buttons and a gilded gorget when on duty; they wore boots instead of gaiters; and were armed with a sword carried on a shoulder-belt.

In addition to the naval artillery, there were also three companies of workers (ouvriers) of the naval artillery and four squads of apprentice gunners (apprentis-canonniers) mentioned in the 1795 decree, but few details were given. The organisation of the apprentice gunners was further defined in a decree of 14 May 1797, with each squad having 152 men, who were trained by the Non-Commissioned Officers of the Naval Artillery demi-brigades. The objective was to provide trained gunners for the fleet. The apprentice gunners were given a blue paletot piped with scarlet with a red fall collar piped white; blue waistcoat and breeches; yellow metal buttons; black leather cap with a brass badge stamped to the arms of the Republic; grey undress paletot and long trousers. Their instructors, or maîtres, were also given a distinctive uniform: dark blue coat and turnbacks, no lapels, red cuffs and collar, brass Naval Artillery buttons; dark blue waistcoat and breeches; plain bicorne hat with a yellow cockade loop. The senior maître-canonniers had two gold laces on the collar while the maître-canonniers had one. The second-maîtres had one gold lace on the cuff while the aide-canonnier had a lace of yellow silk on the collar. The maître-artificier had the above uniform but with sky blue collar, cuffs, and lapels 'for distinction'. All instructors were armed with a sabre, which was carried in a shoulder-belt.

Because there had been no naval infantry corps since 1794, the naval artillery was tasked with acting as the ships 'garrison', that is to say infantry, and were equipped for the task. On shore they were also to garrison the ports and coastal fortifications. How this worked out in practice during this chaotic period is certainly open to debate and further research. That the full establishment was ever reached seems very doubtful. There was also an acute shortage of sailors so that, during the unlucky Expedition to Ireland in December 1796, the naval artillerymen made up half of the crews on ships which would probably have been lost to heavy seas without their assistance. They were detached on all warships and saw much action against their British foes up to the cessation of hostilities in the later part of 1801.

However, the naval artillery also saw action other than the occasional naval skirmish. Some were with the Nautical Legion (Légion Nautique) formed in Egypt after the Battle of Aboukir Bay in 1798. On 30 June 1798 the French Army of the Orient's Nautical Legion was split into three battalions, with 3,000 troops total under the control of the army headquarters. By 23 September 1800, the Army of the Orient's Naval Artillery had a strength of five companies and a staff, for a total of 213 officers and men. By 21 January 1801, the naval artillery comprised a staff and give companies with a strength of 15 officers and 280 men.

Others were detached from sea duties, formed into 16 companies of 'grenadiers' and sent to Italy in 1801. Others took part in General Charles Leclerc's 1802 expedition to Saint-Domingue and saw action against the troops of Toussaint Louverture in February and March. They were later formed into a battalion to serve on the island and most perished there from yellow fever during the later part of 1802. On 8 May 1802, the naval artillery was serving under General Jean Boudet's division, and comprised 1,300 officers and men. In June 1802, a detachment of naval artillery was formed as part of the troops leaving for Martinique. In July another naval artillery detachment was formed for General Antoine Richepanse's expedition to Guadeloupe.

=== Napoleonic Wars ===
In 1803, the new Emperor of the French Napoleon implemented a series of reforms for everything from the new corps system to the re-establishment of the regimental system and reorganisation of the navy. Therefore, on 5 May 1803 the seven demi-brigades were abolished and transformed into four new regiments. The 1st and 2nd regiments had four battalions (2nd had a 5th battalion from June 1805), while the 3rd and fourth had two battalions each. Each battalion comprised six companies of 200 men per battalion so that the maximum establishment was 14,400 men. This was a considerable reduction over the previous establishment, but probably represented the actual strength of the corps. The naval artillery also had four companies of ouvriers, each of 150 men; the four were augmented by a fifth company for service in Antwerp and Boulogne on 7 May 1805 and a sixth company for Genoa on 11 June 1805. There were also four companies of apprentis-canonniers, each of 137 men; three more were raised on 6 October 1803, but one was disbanded in 1805. On 9 November 1805 the title of Imperial Corps of Naval Artillery (Corps Impérial de l'Artillerie de la Marine) was granted. The stations of the regiments in 1805 was as follows: 1st regiment with four battalions in Brest, 2nd regiment with 1st battalion in Genoa, 2nd and 4th Battalions in Brest, 3rd and 5th Battalions at Toulon, 3rd Regiment in Rochefort, and 4th Regiment in Lorient. On 29 February 1812 the establishment of each company was raised to 250, which made the corps some 19,500 strong. The regiments were distributed after this as follows: 1st Regiment in Brest, 2nd Regiment with one battalion in Genoa, two battalions in Toulon, one battalion in Lorient, and one battalion in Rochefort, 3rd Regiment in Cherbourg, and 4th Regiment in Antwerp.

==== Smaller campaigns ====
The first years of the corps were made painful by the naval defeats at Trafalgar in 1805 and San Domingo in 1806, but the bravery of these sea soldiers was never in doubt and they carried on, sometimes cheered by a small victory for instance, naval artilleryman Lt. Heudes receiving the Legion of Honour for his outstanding conduct during the Piémontaise's capture of the Warren Hastings in the Indian Ocean on 21 June 1806. There were also small detachments of naval artillery in Guadeloupe and a company in Santo Domingo from 1806 to 1808. A battalion was with General Jean-Andoche Junot's Army of Portugal from November 1807 to November 1808. A provisional battalion of naval artillery was stationed on Belle Île from 1809 to 1811; and another sent to Flushing in 1811. A detachment of three officers and 120 men (one company) served in Spain as land artillery from 1811 to 1814. Officers of the naval artillery were detached to various duties–usually to battalions of workers (bataillons des équipiges) with the Grande Armée in Austria during the 1809 campaign, Spain from 1810, and Russia in 1812–but a few were also sent to Java in the Dutch East Indies during 1810.

==== German Campaign ====
Following the loss of most of his army in the snows of Russia, Napoleon sought to raise a new Grande Armée, and his attention turned to the veteran troops of the four regiments of naval artillery. On 24 January they were transferred from the Naval Department to the War Department and reorganised during February, but they retained the suffix title de la Marine. The regiments themselves were also reorganised as follows: 1st Regiment was to have eight battalions of six companies each, with an establishment of 137 men and three officers per company, 2nd Regiment had ten battalions, while the 3rd and 4th had four battalions each. Six battalions of the best gunners remained in the ports. Twenty battalions, representing an actual fighting strength of 9,640 men, marched into German in March and formed the major part of Marshal Auguste de Marmont, Duke of Ragusa's reformed VI Corps. After some initial adjustments for troops which had been used to a sedentary artillery service, the 'Naval Division' became an outstanding infantry formation.

At the Battle of Lützen, the Naval Division held the right of the army, formed in squares, and repulsed seven enemy cavalry charges, causing heavy casualties, particularly to the Prussian Guard Hussar Regiment. Marching towards the east, VI Corps then repulsed a Russian force at the Battle of Bautzen. Thereafter, some officers and 500 men of the naval artillery were transferred to the Imperial Guard Artillery, while four more battalions came from France to reinforce VI Corps, leaving only a battalion in Brest and another in Toulon.

Vi Corps took part in the Battle of Dresden and campaigned in Bohemia later that month and into September. Facing three large allied field armies, the French retreated until they reached Leipzig, where a massive three-day battle was fought. The French had to retreat, but the naval artillery of VI Corps won outstanding praise from Marshal Marmont for their 'heroic conduct' under withering fire. Retreating towards the west, VI Corps also fought at the Battle of Hanau (30 October). As the 1813 campaign ended, the losses to the four regiments spoke of their outstanding bravery. Even allowing for deserters, which appear to have been few in the naval artillery, and about 1,700 men detached to other corps, the corps reported 2,412 killed, 7,291 wounded or sick, and 2,319 prisoners or unaccounted for. Thus, of 17,338 men sent to the units, only 3,661 remained present and fit for duty.

==== French Campaign ====
On 7 November 1813 the naval artillery was again reorganised as follows: 1st Regiment with two battalions of 557 men total, 2nd Regiment with four battalions of 1,897 men, 3rd Regiment with three battalions of 632 men, and 4th Regiment with three battalions of 575 men. VI Corps took part in many engagements in the 1814 campaign in France, fighting off cavalry charges while retreating, retaking Meaux (27 February), and fighting against all odds at the Battle of Paris (30 March). After Napoleon's abdication, the four regiments were sent to Normandy, where they mustered. Out of over 18,000 officers and men, sent in 1813, only 693 were left on 2 May 1814.

=== Bourbon Restoration ===
With the advent of the royal government came another reorganisation for the naval artillerymen, who were, from 1 July 1814, divided into three regiments and renamed as the Royal Corps of Naval Cannoneers (Corps Royal des Canonniers de la Marine). During the Hundred Days, the corps rallied to the Emperor. A couple of battalions were sent to Paris (Corps of Observation of the Reserve) and another to Lyon (Corps of Observation of the Alps), but the corps saw no action. The return of Louis XVIII led to further reorganisation in 1816, when the gunners were again renamed as the Royal Corps of Naval Artillery (Corps Royal d'Artillerie de La Marine). Thus passed away one of the finest, yet least-known corps of Napoleon's armed forces.

== Uniforms ==
The dress of the naval artillerymen decreed in 1803 was a dark blue coat with dark blue cuffs, lapels and turnbacks, piped with scarlet; red collar piped white and red cuff flaps; brass buttons; dark blue waistcoat and breeches; and black gaiters. First Class gunners had two red epaulettes with fringes, Second Class gunners had red shoulder straps and Aspirans gunners had dark blue shoulder straps piped red. Non-commissioned officers and gunners who were master gunners had a gold lace edging the collar. The accoutrements were white instead of black as previously, but the hanger was only worn by Non-commissioned officers and First Class gunners, as before.

For undress, a dark blue paletot and linen pantaloons were worn. The musket was the same model as that of the army artillery and had brass furnishings. A bicorne hat with a yellow cockade loop and red pom-pom was worn until 1807, when it was replaced by a black shako with red cords and pom-pom (red plume for dress occasions) and brass plate. Red bands at the top and base of the shako were probably worn until c. 1810, when they became black, as in the army artillery.

The companies of workers of the artillery had the same uniform as the artillerymen except for the scarlet lapels. The apprentice-cannoneers had a plain blue paletot and a leather cap with a brass plate bearing 'the attributes of the artillery'.

During the 1813 and 1814 campaigns, the four artillery regiments wore dark blue greatcoats with blue pantaloons and black shako covers. Because of this dress, and their remarkable steadfastness in battle, they were sometimes mistaken by the enemy for the Imperial Old Guard.

Officers had the same uniform as above but with gilded buttons, gorget, sword, and knee boots with yellow-buff turndown. However, there were deviations. The colonel of the 1st Regiment improved on the officer's uniform in 1809 by adding gold grenades at the collar, a wide white swordbelt with a large gold plate and high black 'Horse Guard' type boots with silver spurs. An officer of the 2nd Regiment spoke approvingly of his 'mameluke' pantaloons with a very wide gold lace, which he wore in 1813.

== Maritime Gendarmes ==
The Maritime Gendarmes (Gendarmerie Maritime) was tasked with policing the ports and naval prefectures. They wore a bicorne laced white with red plume; dark blue coat with red collar, cuffs, lapels, and turnbacks; white aiguillettes; buff waistcoat and breeches, and buff belts edged white. This was the same uniform as the National Gendarmes (Gendarmerie Nationale) except for the white metal b buttons, which were stamped with an anchor and 'Gendarmerie Maritime'.

== Awards ==
Throughout the Napoleonic Wars, the seven regiments of naval artillery were awarded a total of: 6 x Fusils d'Honneur, 1 x Mousqueton d’Honneur, 1 x Carbine d’Honneur, 15 x Grenades d’Honneur, and 1 x Hache d’Abordage d’Honneur.
