= Port of Antwerp =

Maritime commercial facility in Antwerp, Belgium

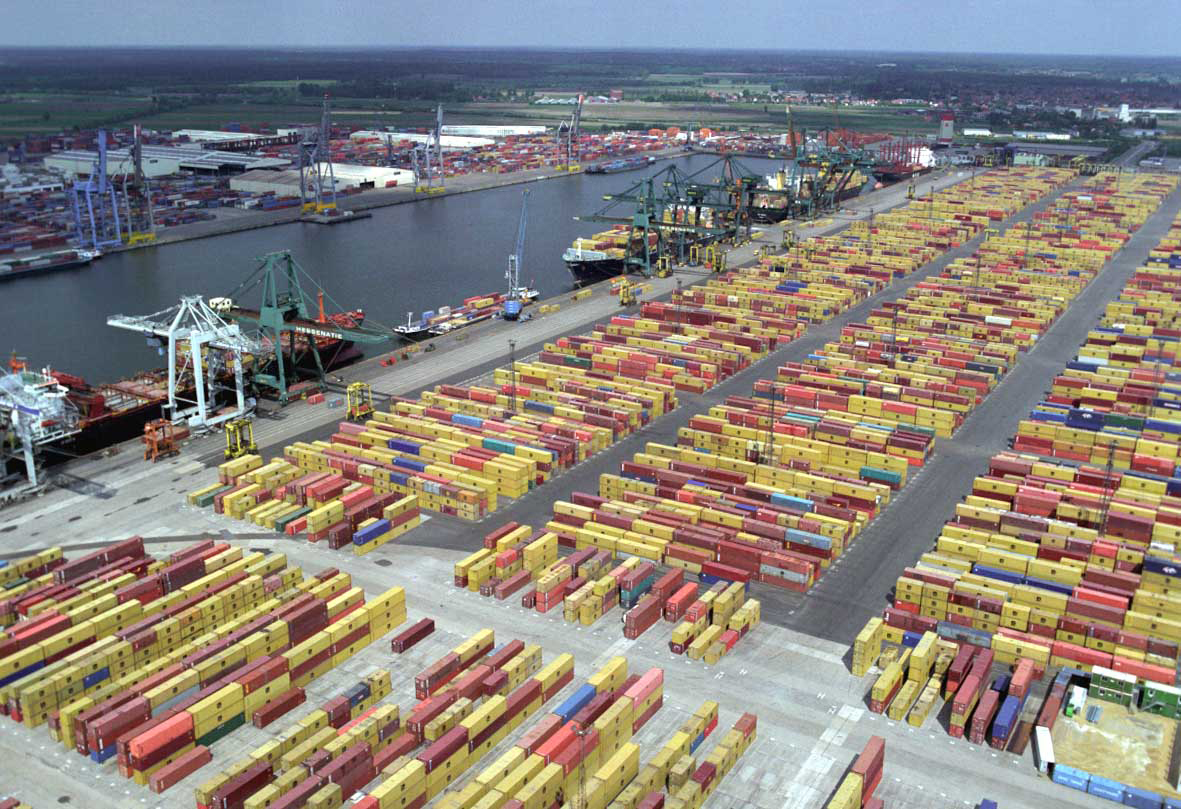
- Mediterranean Shipping Company's former container terminal in the Bevrijdingsdok. An idea of the size of this terminal can be obtained from the fact that each of the six berthed ships are at least 250 m long
- Interactive map of Port of Antwerp
- Location in Belgium

Location
- Country: Belgium
- Location: Antwerp; East Flanders; Flanders
- Coordinates: 51°16′12″N 4°20′12″E
- UN/LOCODE: BEANR

Statistics
- Vessel arrivals: 21,072 sea ships (2023)
- Annual cargo tonnage: 286.9 million tonnes (2023)
- Annual container volume: ▲13.4 million TEU (2023)

The port of Antwerp is the port of the city of Antwerp, Belgium. It is located in Flanders, mainly in the province of Antwerp, but also partially in East Flanders. It is a seaport in the heart of Europe accessible to capesize ships. It is Europe's second-largest seaport, after that of Rotterdam. Antwerp stands at the upper end of the tidal estuary of the Scheldt. The estuary is navigable by ships of more than 100,000 Gross Tons as far as 80 km inland. Like the Port of Hamburg, the Port of Antwerp's inland location provides a more central location in Europe than the majority of North Sea ports. Antwerp's docks are connected to the hinterland by rail, road, and river and canal waterways. As a result, the port of Antwerp has become one of Europe's largest seaports, ranking second behind Rotterdam by total freight shipped. Its international rankings vary from 11th to 20th (AAPA). In 2012, the Port of Antwerp handled 14,220 sea trade ships (190.8 million tons of cargo, 53.6% in containers), 57,044 inland barges (123.2 million tons of cargo), and offered liner services to 800 different maritime destinations.

== History ==
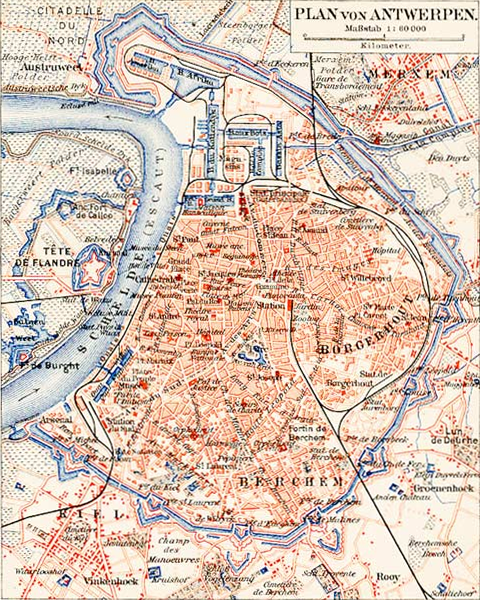
This 1897 map clearly shows the state of dock development at the end of the 19th century. The docks on the south side of the city (at bottom) were filled in during the 1970s.

Antwerp's potential as a seaport was recognized by Napoleon Bonaparte; he ordered the construction of Antwerp's first lock and dock in 1811. Called the Bonaparte Dock, it was joined by a second dock – called the Willem Dock after the Dutch King – in 1813. When the Belgian Revolution broke out in 1830, there was a well-founded fear that the Dutch would blockade the Scheldt again but, in the event, they contented themselves with levying a stiff toll. Fortunately, the young Belgium had friends in Britain and particularly in the person of Lord Palmerston, who believed the existence of Belgium would be beneficial to Britain, and that, in consequence, it was important to make sure that the newly born state was economically viable.

With his support, the Belgian government was able to redeem the Dutch Toll in 1863. By that time, the Kattendijk Dock had been completed in 1860, and the all-important Iron Rhine Railway to the Ruhr had been finished in 1879. Antwerp then experienced a second golden age, and by 1908 eight docks had been constructed. The opening of the Royers Lock, commenced in 1905, meant that ships drawing up to 31 feet (9.4 m) of water were able to enter the existing docks and access the new Lefèbvre and America docks. Such was the situation at the outbreak of the First World War in 1914. The British, and Winston Churchill, then First Lord of the Admiralty, in particular were well aware of the Port of Antwerp's strategic importance, so much so that Churchill arrived in Antwerp on 4 October 1914 to take charge of the defence of the city and its port.

In 1944, during the Second World War, Allied forces liberated Antwerp on 4 September. The port and facilities were relatively undamaged and no major reconstruction work was required. However, the port could not be used until 28 November, after the estuary approaches were cleared by the Battle of the Scheldt. Walcheren was the key that allowed use of the port, located further upstream on the right bank of the southern estuary of the river. Walcheren was attacked by Canadian and British forces and on 8 November all German resistance on the island had been overrun. An agreement assigned a large portion of the northern section of the port to the Americans and the southern section and the city of Antwerp to the British forces. The first US cargo vessel James B. Weaver arrived on 28 November 1944 with men of the 268th Port Company and their equipment on board. By mid-December the port was operating in high gear and, on average, some 9,000 civilians were employed by the Americans. Despite enemy air attacks, rockets and buzz bombs, operations were never entirely halted, although they were interrupted. In the first half year of 1945, the average amount of cargo discharged was around 0.5 million tons per month. After the close of the hostilities in Europe, the port was used for shipments of ammunition, vehicles, tanks and personnel to the Pacific. After the capitulation of Japan, shipments were directed to the United States. As from November 1945 the activities declined and by October 1946 all US Army operations ceased.

When peace returned, work started on the Grote Doorsteek, an ambitious plan which ultimately resulted in the extension of the docklands on the right bank of the Scheldt to the Dutch border. The construction of the Berendrecht Lock was the crowning element of this plan. It was the world's largest shipping lock when inaugurated in 1989. Since 1989, development has been concentrated on the creation of fast turnround tidal berths, both on the Right Bank (Europa Terminal and the North Sea Terminal) and on the Left Bank (Deurganck Dock).

== Port lay-out ==
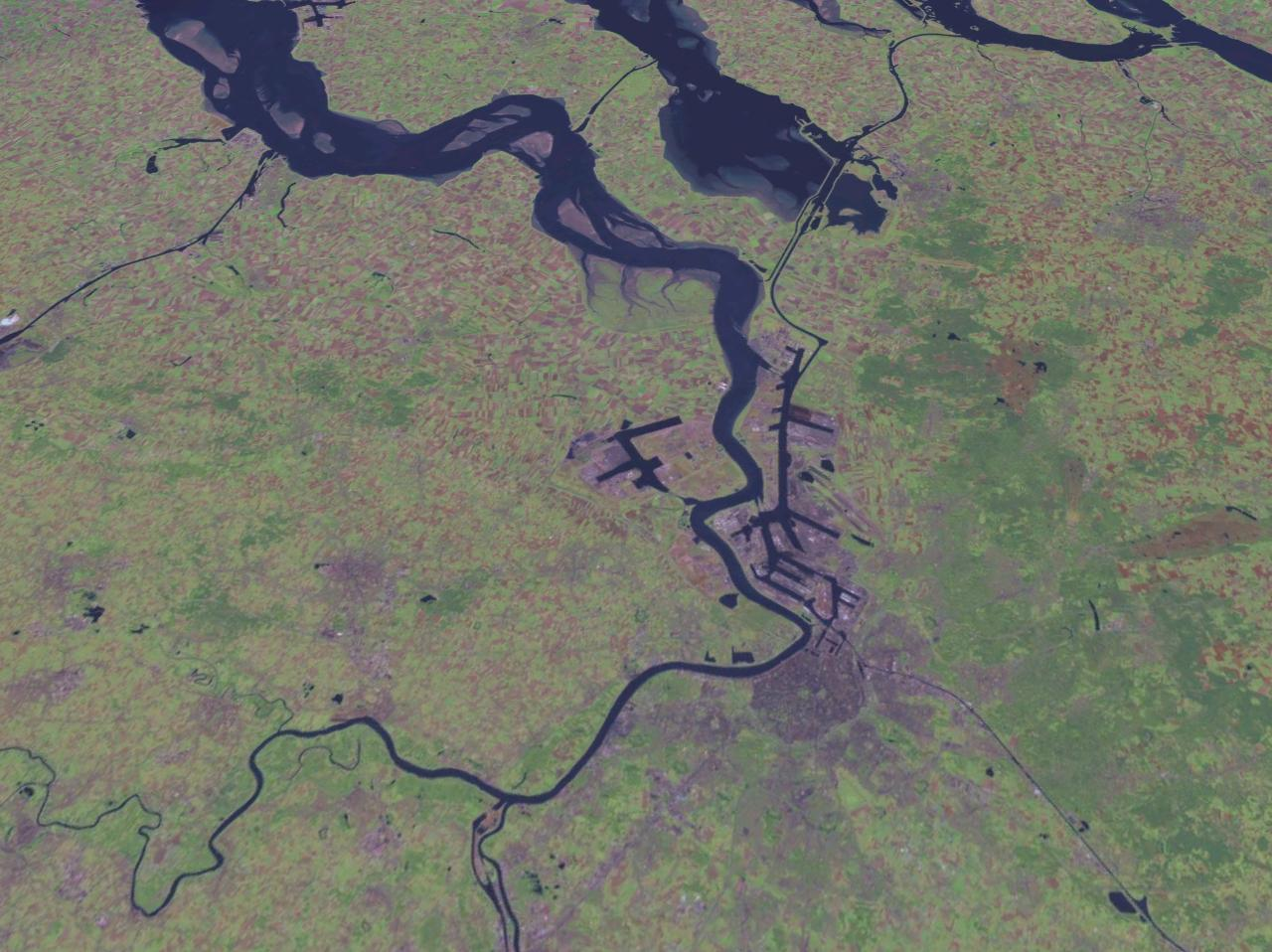
Antwerp's infrastructure before works started on the Deurganck Dock. The Scheldt runs from south to north between the geometrical outlines of the docks on the left and right banks. Other details include the Brussels–Scheldt Maritime Canal at bottom centre, the Albert Canal (the thin line running South East from the docks), the Rhine-Scheldt Junction Canal (top centre), and the Ghent–Terneuzen Canal at top left.

=== Right bank ===
With the opening of the Berendrecht Lock (1989), a crowning achievement in developing the right bank dock complex was obtained. With a length of 500 m between the lock gates and a width of 68 m, the Berendrecht lock was the largest lock in the world when it was built (overtaken by the Kieldrecht lock on Antwerp's Left bank). This lock has a depth of 13.50 m, which makes the sill depth at mean high water equal to 17.75 m. Apart from the Lock, still further development of the right bank has been undertaken on the banks of the Scheldt outside the dock complex. Two large container terminals have been opened here. In 1990, the Europe terminal was operative, while secondly, the North Sea terminal became operative in 1997.

The older areas of the port, such as the Bonaparte dock, are being modernized as needs dictate to make them suitable for modern cargo handling operations. Among this modernisation, an upgrade of the Amerika dock, the Albert dock and the third harbour dock are being done to make them accessible to Panamax ships, which have a draught of 42 feet (13 m). Other modernisation projects being undertaken is the Bevrijdingsdok (Liberation dock), formerly known as the Leo Delwaide dock, which will soon be able to serve the latest generation of container vessels. The Southern part of the Bevrijdingsdok, used to be the MSC Home Terminal, a partnership between PSA Hesse-Noord Natie and Mediterranean Shipping Company, before it moved to the newly built Deurganckdok on the left bank, to avoid passage through the locks. Due to a total quay length of more than 2 km, several ships can be handled at the same time. The MSC Home Terminal has an annual capacity of more than 3.6 million twenty-foot equivalent units (TEU).

=== Left bank ===
The first plans for the development of the Waaslandhaven on Antwerp's left bank were prepared in the boom years of the 1960s. At that time, it was hoped that agreement could be reached with the Dutch on the construction of the Baalhoek Canal, which would have run from Kallo in Belgium through the Drowned Land of Saefthinge (on Dutch territory) into the Western Scheldt. This grand concept had the advantage that it would cut off the difficult bend known as the Bocht van Bath and facilitate access to deep draught ships. Work started on the Kallo Lock in 1979, and by the end of the 1980s the basic outlines of the Waaslandhaven were by and large complete. The main constituents are the Waasland Canal, the Verrebroek Dock, and the Vrasene Dock. The abandonment of the Baalhoek Canal project meant that an additional dock, known as the Doel Dock, was never fitted out for shipping. The development of the sites in the new docklands got off to a slow start, but took off in the 1990s. Nowadays, the trades handled in the Vrasene Dock include forest products, fruit juice, cars, plastic granulates, scrap and bulk gas. The equipping of the Verrebroek Dock started in 1996 and saw the arrival of its first seagoing ship in 2000. When finalized, this dock will offer a total of 5 km of berths with a draught of 14.5 m.

=== Deurganck Dock ===
Since the existing container terminals on the right bank of the Scheldt have reached their maximum capacity and the container freight volume keeps increasing (in 2007 it expanded by 8.2% to 8 million TEU), a new dock complex was constructed: the tidal Deurganck Dock, which is open to the river and which does not require vessels to pass through any lock. The first terminal in this dock was opened on July 6, 2005. The full capacity of the dock is estimated at more than 8 to 9 million TEU. The Deurganck dock has a wharf length of 5.5 km and consists of a total of 1,200,000 cubic metres of concrete. The Kieldrecht Lock, a new lock at the end of the Deurganckdock, giving access to the docks in the port area on the left bank opened in June 2016 and is the largest lock in the world. The lock is deeper than the Berendrecht Lock, the previous largest, in response to the trend towards ever-larger ships. The lock, which represents an investment of 340 million euros, is the second lock into the enclosed harbours and represents a failsafe feature; had the sole lock failed, any vessels inside would have been trapped, whereas it is highly improbable that both locks might simultaneously fail. On the landward side, facing the dock complex, the lock leads into the Waasland canal. From there the ships have easy access to all the other docks on the left bank: the Doel dock, the Verrebroek dock, the Vrasene dock and the North and South mooring docks. Since 2015, the north side of the dock is operated by the joint venture between MSC and PSA international, commonly referred to as MPET. The south side of the dock is operated by DP world, the terminal is known by the name 'Antwerp Gateway'.

== Recent history ==
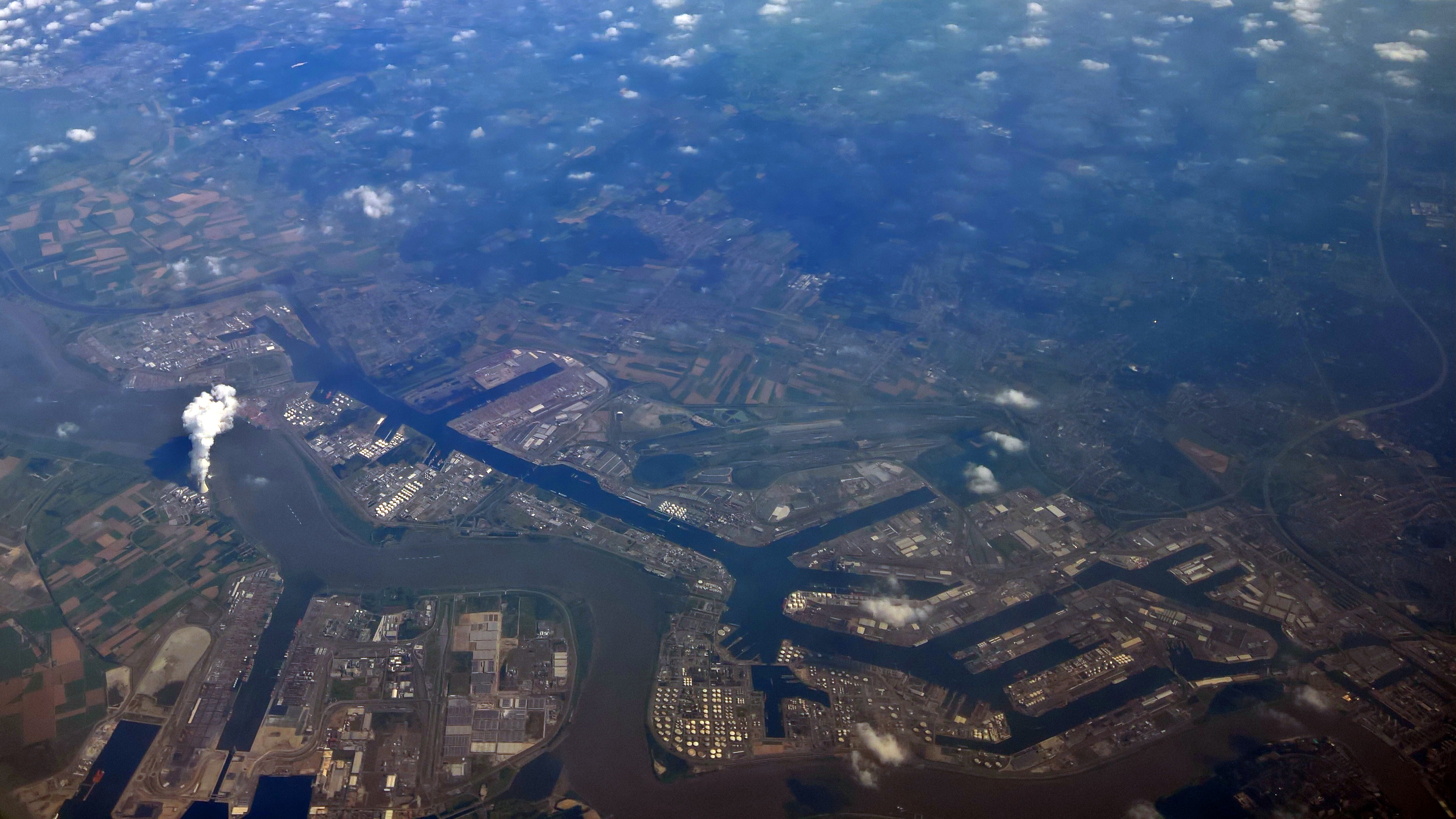
The Port of Antwerp as seen from a commercial airliner. The Right Bank runs from the middle left side to the bottom right side of the photo. The Scheldt runs below from the middle left side to the middle bottom side. The Deurganck Dock is seen at the bottom left side. Other details include the Kieldrecht Lock connecting the Deurganck Dock to the Left Bank (partially visible at the extreme bottom left side). The Doel Nuclear Power Station is also seen at the middle left side of the photo.

In October 2010, the port approved a long-term investment plan, worth 1.6 billion Euros over the next 15 years. The port would improve existing facilities, and acquire land from General Motors, which is closing its Antwerp factory. Unlike the Port of Rotterdam, which has been able to expand westwards along the river Maas to Europoort and extend into the North Sea with Maasvlakte, Antwerp has little scope for further westward expansion. The northern (right bank) docks already reach the Dutch border, and on the left bank Belgium has a nuclear power plant downstream of the Deurganck dock.

In October 2019, the Port of Antwerp began using a dual-fuel tug that is powered by hydrogen and diesel (called HydroTug).

In 2022, an agreement was reached on the merger of the ports of Antwerp and Zeebrugge. The official name was changed to "Port of Antwerp Bruges".

The port signed an agreement with the Port of Nagoya on 7 December 2022, extending an agreement between the ports first established in 1988.

== Lillo Port Centre ==
On the east bank of the river Scheldt, but to the west of the main port area lies the old village of Lillo, where the Port of Antwerp has built a new visitor centre. Coach parties can arrive here, and (after a brief introduction and the donning of hard hats and hi-viz jackets) an official guide boards the coach and directs the party to visit places that would otherwise be prohibited under ISPS.

In July 2020, the total throughput of the Port of Antwerp fell by 4.9% in the first half of the year compared to the same period in 2019.

Photo gallery
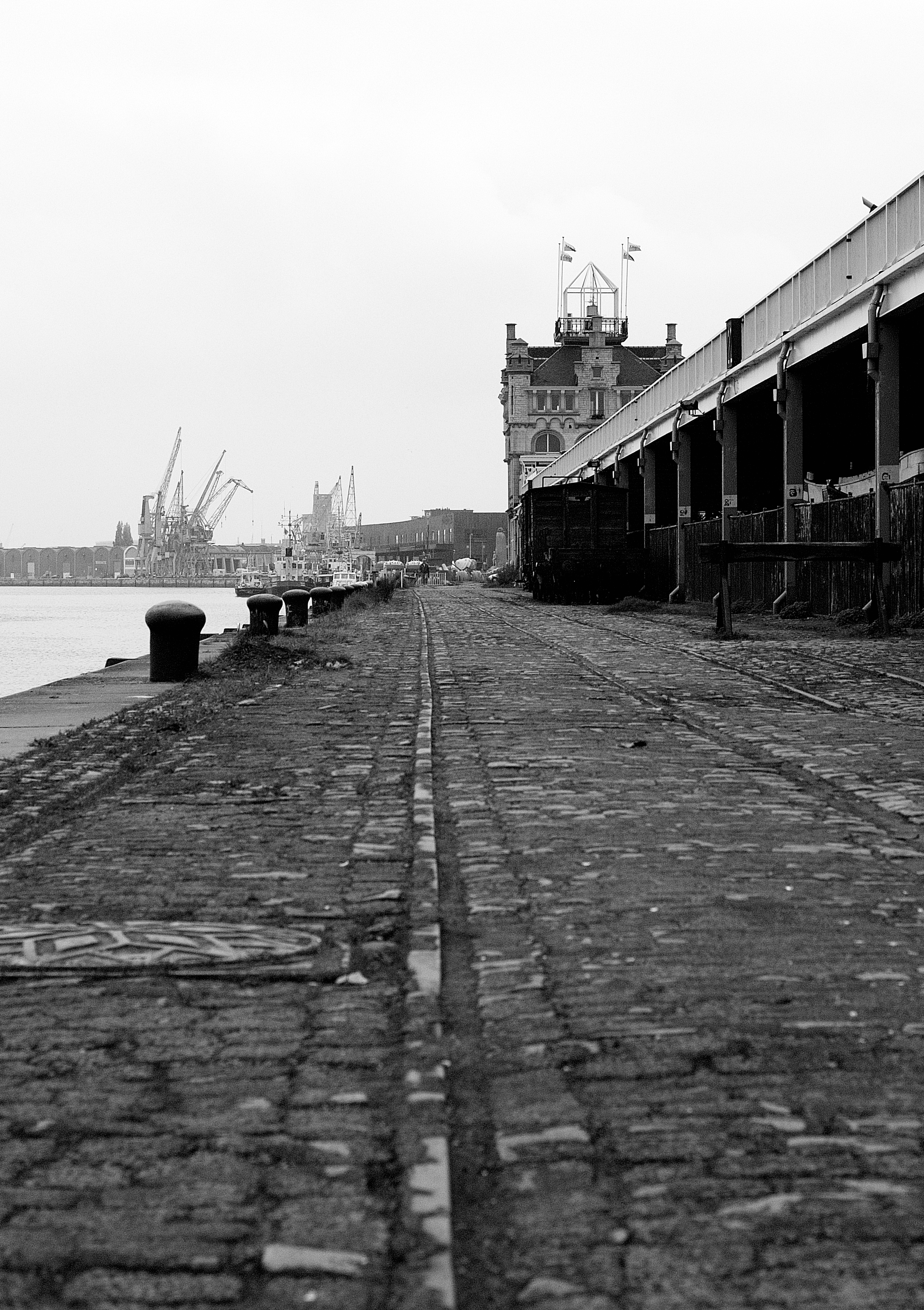
Part of Antwerp's old waterfront looking north to the Noorderterras café building

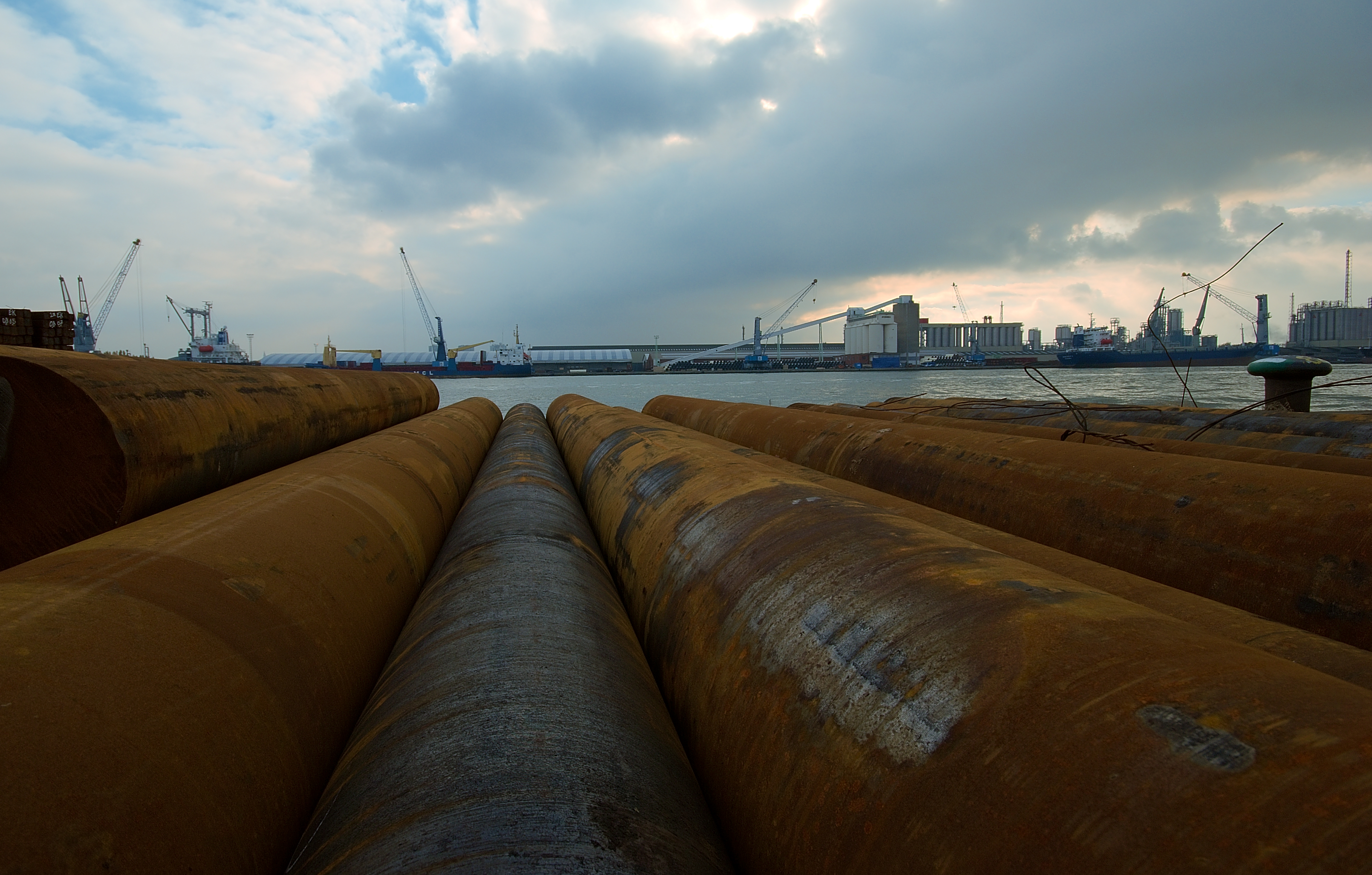

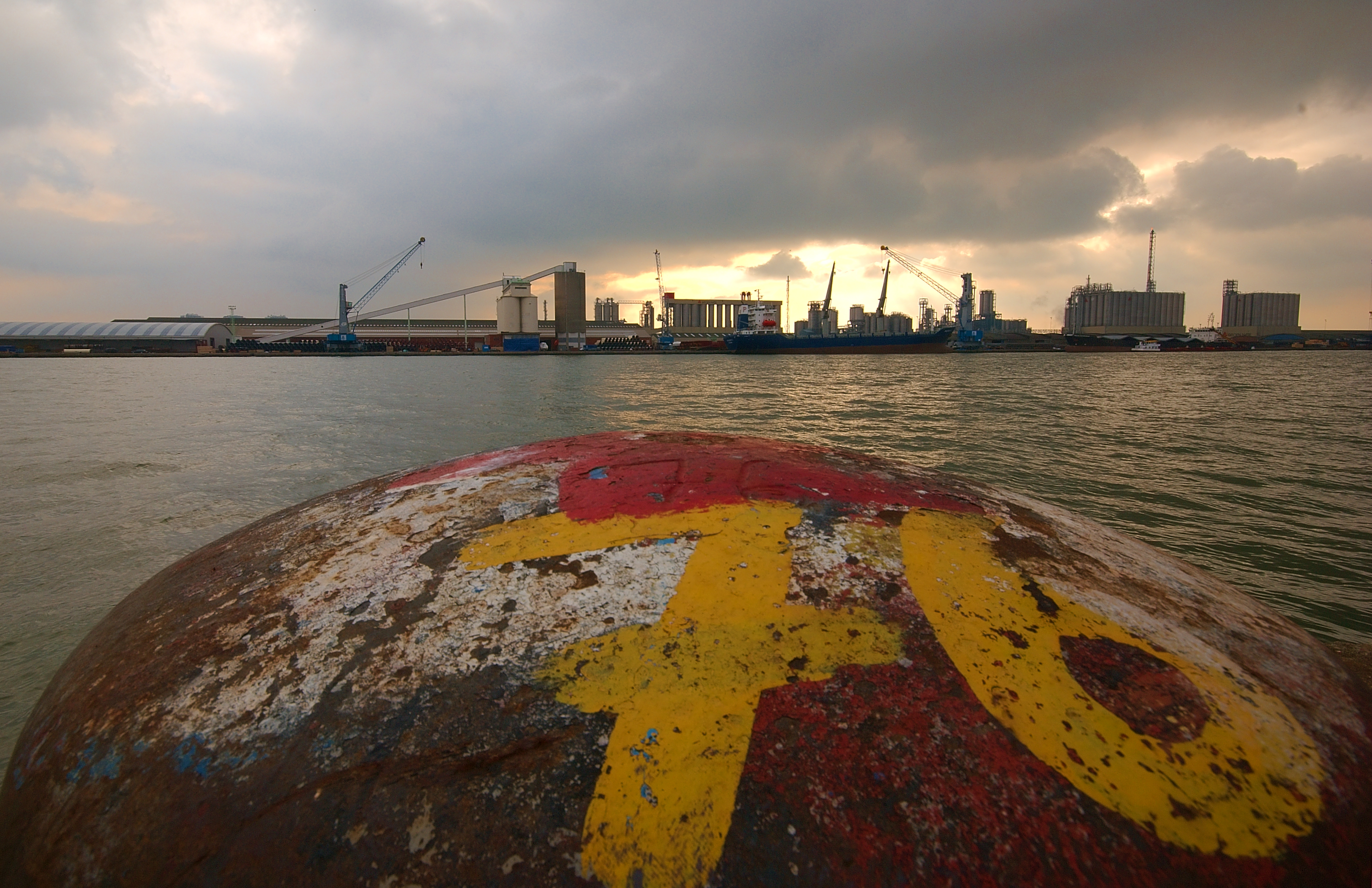

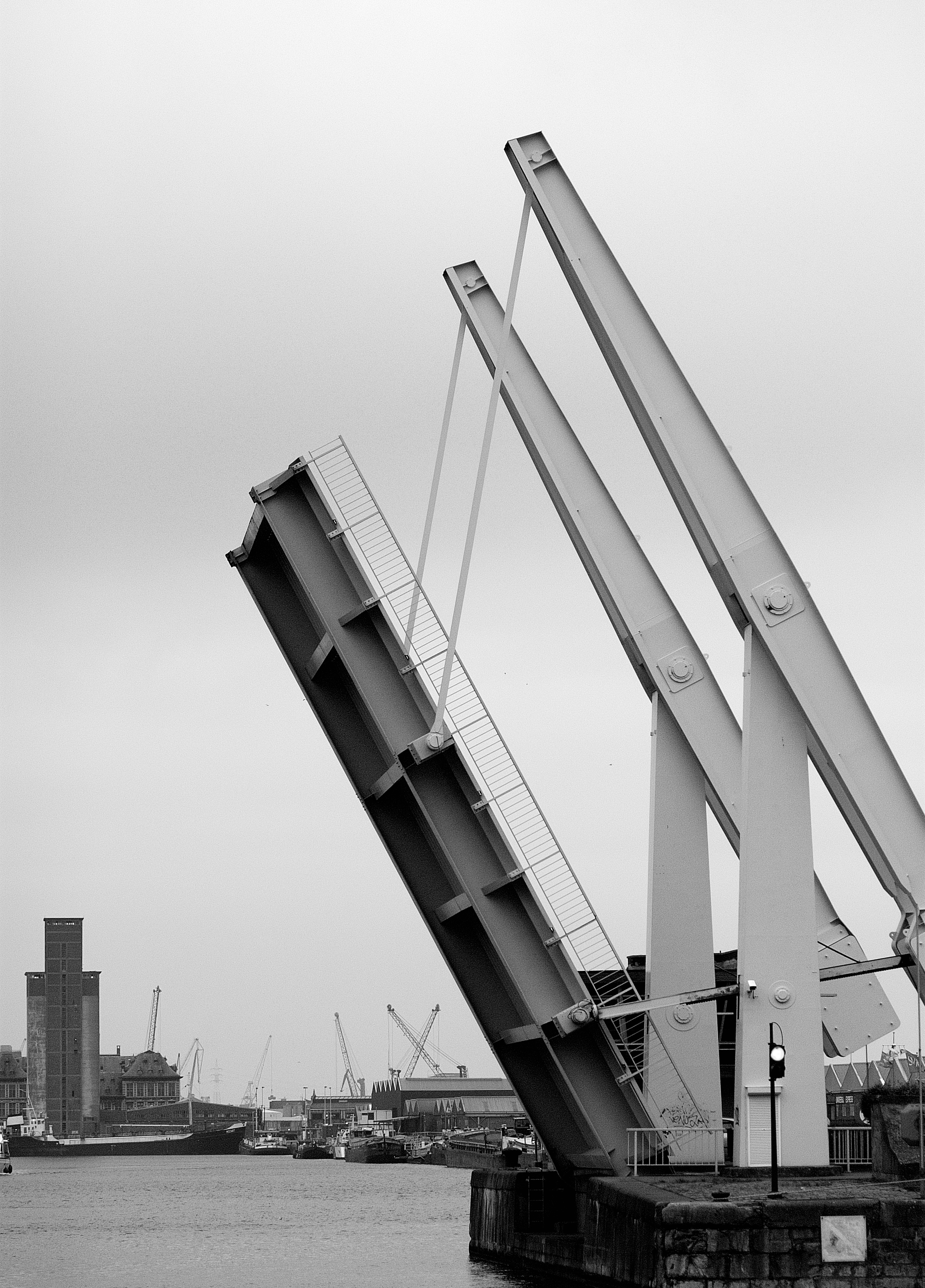
The London bridge with the Kattendijk dock behind it and grain silo at the America dock in the background
Canal dock B2

== Records ==
The Flare Tower 1 of Olefin refinery is with a height of 211 metres at least the tallest flare stick in Europe, the electricity pylon of powerline EA-235 at the western bank of Deurganckdok is with a height of 165.95 metres the tallest strainer in Europe.

== See also ==
- Flanders Institute for Logistics (VIL)
