= Royers Lock =

Coordinates: 51°14′26″N 4°24′05″E

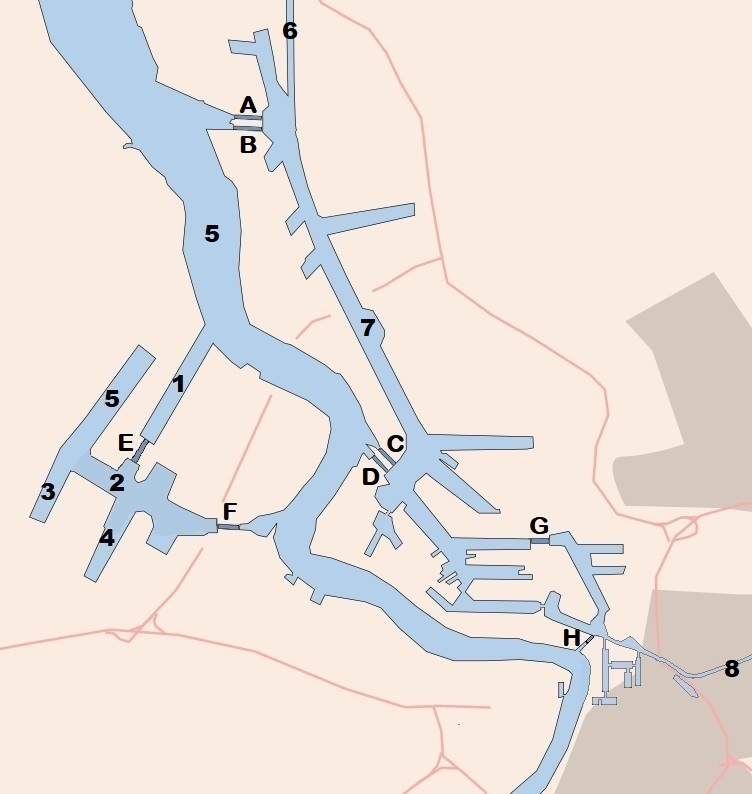
Location on a map of the Port of Antwerp H = Royers Lock 8 = Albert Canal

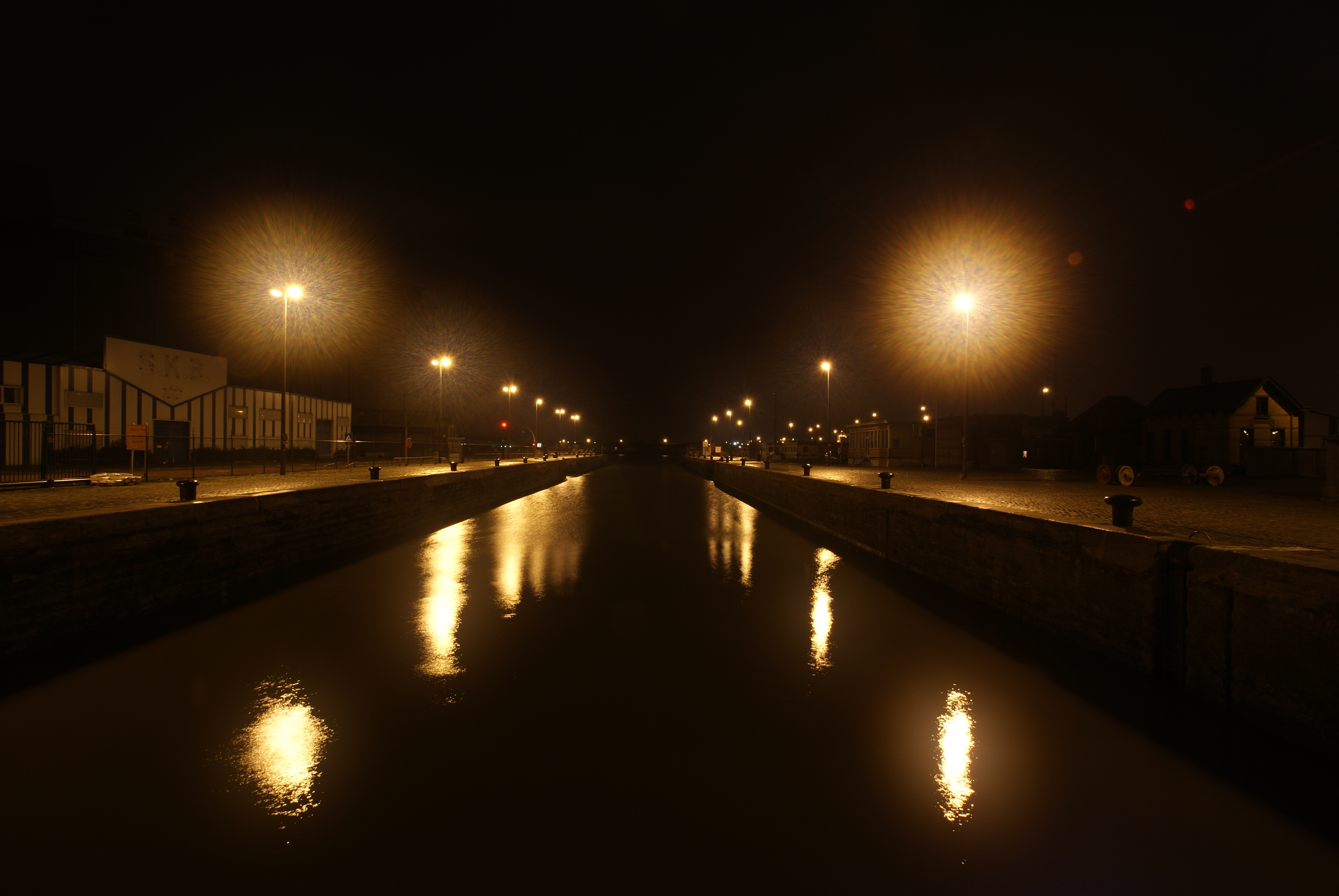
Royers lock by night seen from the Royers bridge

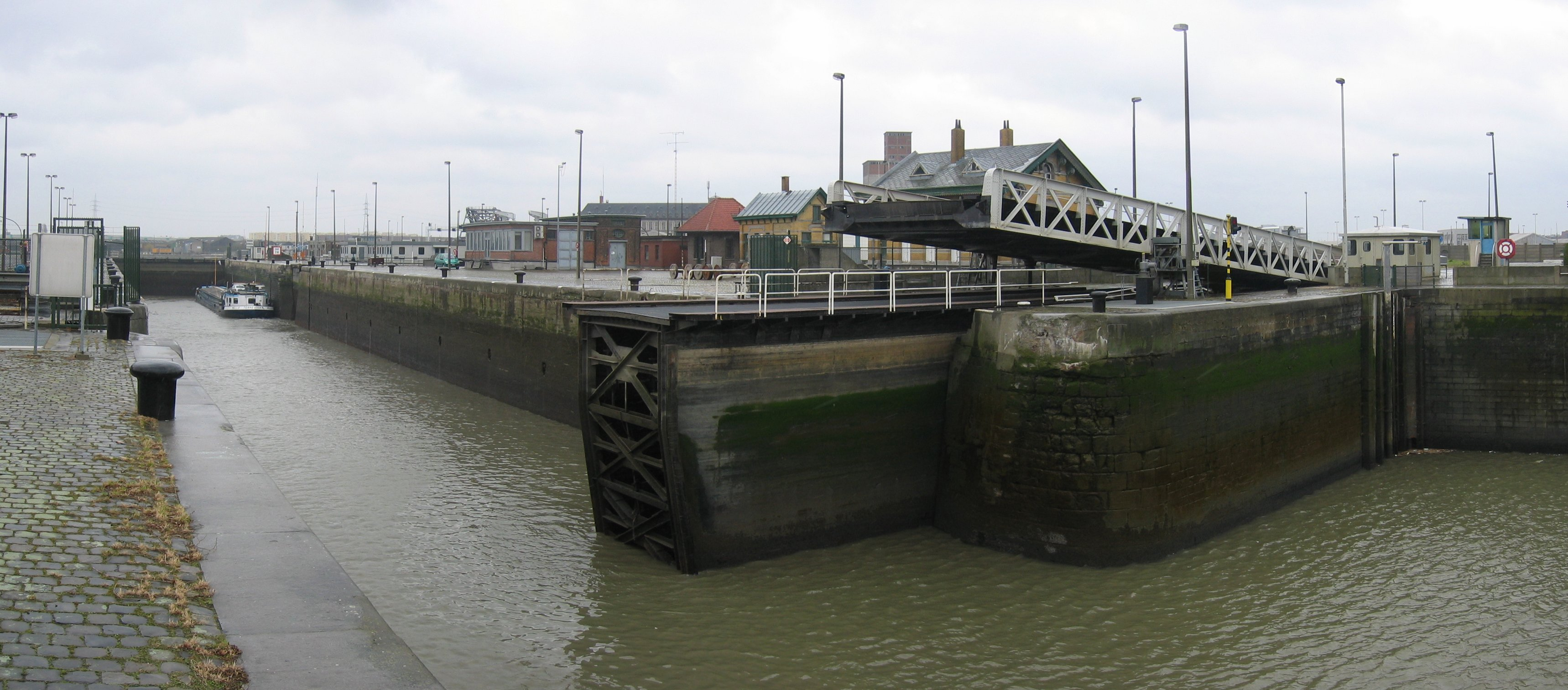
The lock seen from the west with the Royers bridge half open

The Royers lock (Dutch Royerssluis) is a tidal lock located in Belgium, giving access to the right bank docks in the Port of Antwerp and the Albert Canal. Although it was built for sea-going vessels, it is now mostly used by riverboats.

The construction of the lock started in 1893 and was finished in 1908. The lock is 180 metres (590 ft) long and 22 meters (72 feet) wide. The operational depth (TAW) is 6.42 meters (21.1 feet).

The lock was built to accommodate the extension of the docklands towards the north. Both the Bonaparte lock (Dutch: bonapartesluis) and the Kattendijk lock (Dutch: kattendijksluis) would not be able to cope with the growing traffic and the increasing size of new ocean ships. The lock is named after the Antwerp city engineer Gustaaf Royers (1848–1923).

The lock has three sliding gates constructed out of steel with caissons that allow to take ballast. The gates slide on a system of rollers on rails at the bottom at right angles to the longitudinal axis of the lock and disappear into special storage chamber or recess built into the sidewall of the dock. After a gate closes, it is ballasted with water and has to deballast before it opens again. There is one gate at each end of the lock and one in between (100 meters from the lower gate). The middle gate had to allow a faster turning time but the gain was very little so the gate was put out of service. For the first time, electrical engines were used to operate the gates.

Road traffic can always use at least one of the two bridges. The Royers bridge (Dutch royersbrug) is on the side of the river Scheldt. The Lefèbvre bridge (Dutch Lefèbvrebrug) is on the side of the Siberiadok, originally named Afrikadok in 1887, but during the Cold War renamed to Lefèbvredok and now part of the Amerikadok. To prevent association of the name Siberia with the USSR during the cold war, a new name was chosen after Théo Lefèvre, who was prime minister of Belgium at the time.

The Royers bridge consists of a road deck on top of the gate and a lift bridge on top of the storage chamber. When opening the lower gate, the bridge is lifted to about 15° to allow the gate to slide inside the storage chamber. The original Lefèbvre bridge has been replaced and now consists of the road deck on top of the gate and a rolling bridge accessible from the sides, to cover the storage chamber.
