= Kruispolderhaven =

- Hamlet
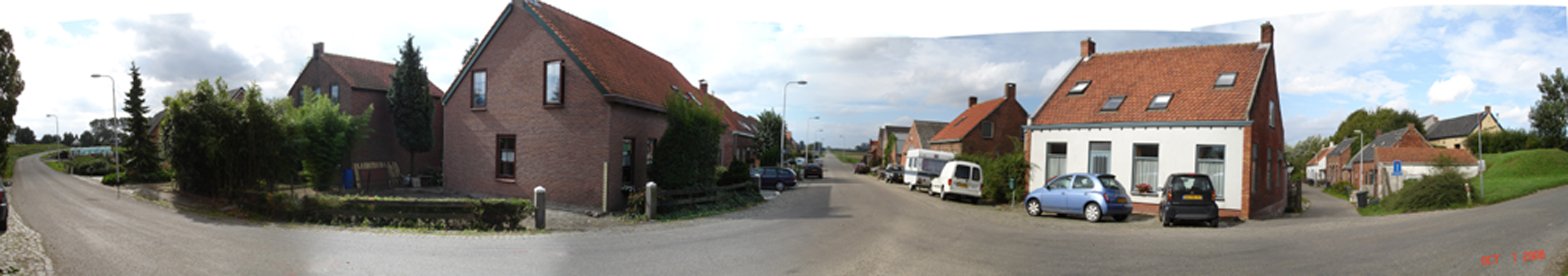
- Kruispolderhaven panorama 2006

- Location in the province of Zeeland in the Netherlands Kruispolderhaven (Netherlands)
- Coordinates: 51°21′18″N 4°5′41″E
- Country: Netherlands
- Province: Zeeland
- Municipality: Hulst

Kruispolderhaven is a hamlet located in the eastern Zeelandic Flanders portion of the Dutch province of Zeeland. Its name originates from its location at the eastern tip of the Kruispolder, a "crossed" polder adjacent to a (now nonexistent) seaport on the southern bank of the Western Scheldt estuary.

== History ==
Kruispolderhaven is the harbour of the Kruispolder, which was reclaimed from the sea in 1612 by the Spaniards. The former island Hontenisse had drowned in 1508/1511. They built the dikes straight and at right angles to each other, making a cross. This newly reclaimed area was named "Cruys Polder" (cross polder), reflecting its uniqueness. People from this area sometimes took the surname Van de Cruys (from the cross), or simply, Cruys. Later derivations of the surname Cruys became Cruijsse, Crouse, and Kruis, among others.

Today, while other dikes protect Kruispolderhaven, the original "cross" dikes have been reduced to field level and are represented by the east-west roads, Kruispolderkaai (cross-polder-quay) and Lange Nieuwstraat (long new-street). The north-south cross is represented by Ooststraat (east-street). Besides Kruispolderhaven, the Kruispolder also contains the hamlets of Kruisdorp and Baalhoek.
