= Jean Dominique Compans =

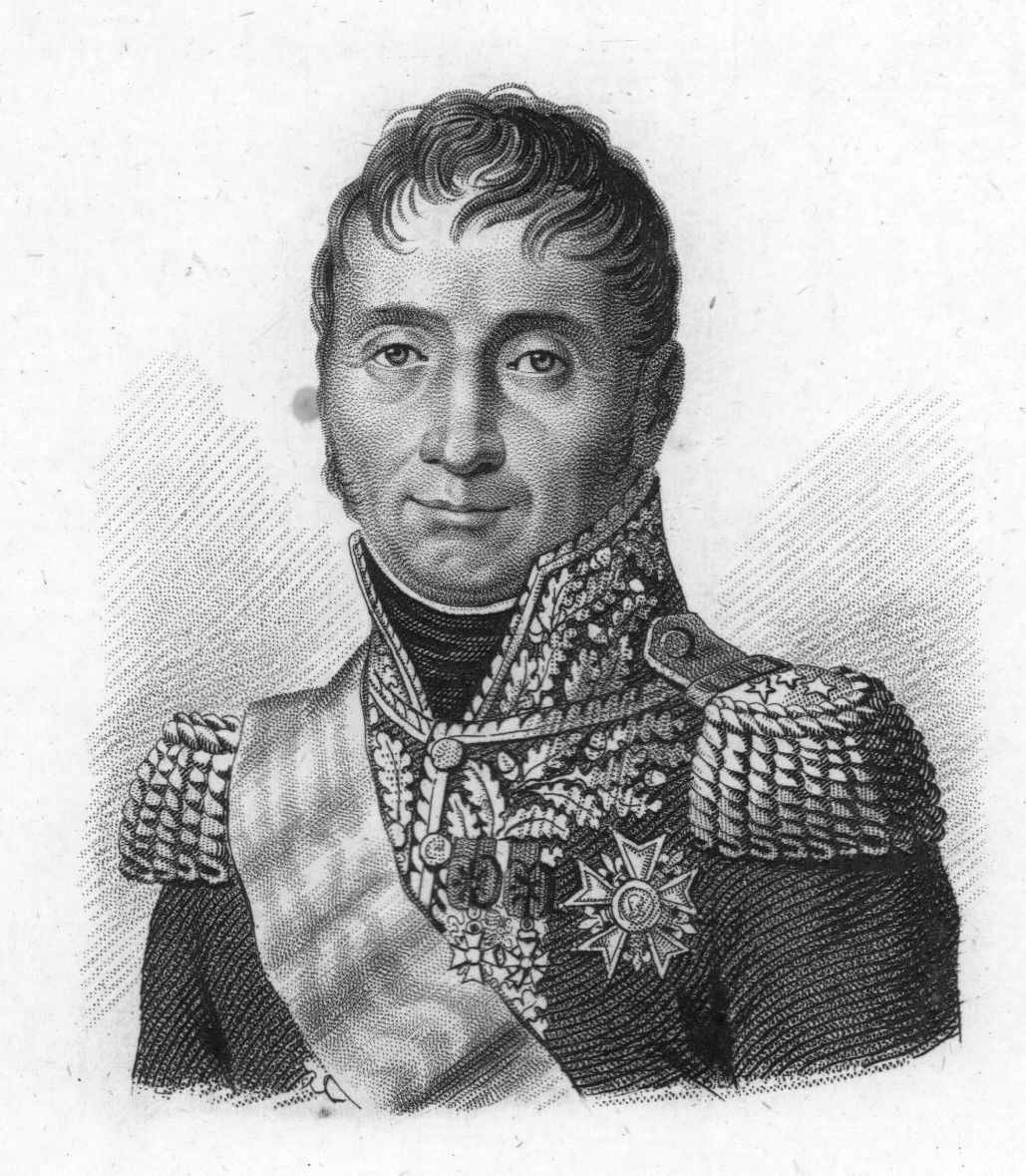

Count Jean Dominique Compans (French pronunciation: [ʒɑ̃ dɔminik kɔ̃pɑ̃]; 26 June 1769, Salies-du-Salat – 10 November 1845, Blagnac) was a French Divisional General from 1811 and a participant of Napoleonic Wars.

== Biography ==
Jean's family had originally intended that he should become a priest, but upon the outbreak of the French Revolution, Compans enlisted into the army in 1791. At age 23 he was promoted to captain in the 3rd battalion of the volunteers of the Haute-Garonne. In 1793 his commanding general Dugommier promoted him to command a battalion in the brigade of Jean Lannes. Compans distinguished himself in the campaigns in Spain and Italy (1793-1797). In 1798 he was put in command of a corps of 16.000 men with which he took the towns of Fossano and Savigliano. In June 1799 he received a temporary promotion to General de brigade, which was made permanent in October. In 1800 Compans was wounded by a musket ball at San Giacomo. Having recovered, he distinguished himself at Montebello and Marengo.

After the Peace of Lunéville Compans was appointed the governor of the province of Coni. In this province, he operated against bandits but having been taken prisoner by them he was released without harm. Compans was wounded at Austerlitz. He distinguished himself as chief of staff of Soult’s 4th Corps at the Battle of Jena after which he was promoted to general de division. During Napoleon’s invasion of Russia Compans distinguished himself at Smolensk, Borodino and Maloyaroslavets. In the 1813 campaign Compans served with honour at Lützen, Bautzen and Leipzig, where he was wounded by bullets and sabre cuts. Recovered he served in the 1814 campaign at La Fère-Champenoise.

After Napoleon's abdication, Compans served Louis XVIII on the War Council. During the Hundred Days he rejoined Napoleon but declined a command in the Army of the North. Having been named a Peer of France by Louis XVIII, in the trial of Marshal Ney he voted for the death penalty. His name is inscribed on the eastern column of the Arc de Triomphe.
