= Baalhoek =

- Hamlet
- Location in the province of Zeeland in the Netherlands Baalhoek (Netherlands)
- Coordinates: 51°21′18″N 4°5′20″E
- Country: Netherlands
- Province: Zeeland
- Municipality: Hulst

Baalhoek is a hamlet in the Dutch province of Zeeland. It is located in the municipality of Hulst, about 5 km east of Kloosterzande on the dyke of the Westerschelde.

The name of the hamlet refers to an old pier to the north, "Ten Ballen", used by a ferry. When the village of Hontenisse disappeared in a flood in 1509, this pier and some of the remaining dykes formed a corner ("hoek"), named "Ballenhouck". The pier disappeared into the Westerschelde around 1600, but the name remained.

According to the 19th-century historian A.J. van der Aa, Baalhoek (or "Balhoek") was the only settlement in the Kruispolder, a polder that was reclaimed from the sea in 1616. In the middle of the 19th century, it consisted of 19 houses, and had a population of more than 70. All of the houses of the hamlet were located on or near the sea dyke. There was a little harbour here. Around the harbour, a new hamlet Kruispolderhaven arose.

Nowadays, the hamlet is the smallest of the three hamlets in the Kruispolder, including Kruisdorp and Kruispolderhaven. Together, these three settlements are also named "Kruispolder".

Baalhoek is mostly associated with the "Baalhoekkanaal" (Baalhoek Canal), a plan for a shortcut to the harbour of Antwerp to bypass the narrows of Bath that was proposed in 1967, but finally rejected in 1998 due to the resistance of a coalition of environmentalists and farmers.
