= Battle of Neresheim (1805) =

1805 battle during the War of the Third Coalition

- Part of the War of the Third Coalition
- Plan of the battle of Neresheim (published in 1828)
Date	c. 17 October 1805
Location	Neresheim, Baden-Württemberg 48.7542°N 10.3344°E
Result	French victory

Belligerents
(France) French Empire	Habsburg monarchy

Commanders and leaders
(France) Joachim Murat	(Habsburg monarchy) Franz von Werneck; (Habsburg monarchy) General Sinzendorf (POW)

Strength
900 men	7,000 men

Casualties and losses
Unknown	1,350 prisoners

The Battle of Neresheim took place on 17 October 1805. It ended in a victory for the French army commanded by Marshal Joachim Murat. The opposing force was the Austrian army of General Franz von Werneck. The action resulted in the capture of 1,350 men. Among the prisoners was General Rudolf von Sinzendorf. The French also captured 2 colours.

== Bibliography ==
- Pigeard, Alain (2004). Dictionnaire des batailles de Napoléon: 1796–1815 (in French). Paris: Tallandier. ISBN 2-84734-073-4.
- Smith, Digby (1998). The Greenhill Napoleonic Wars Data Book: Actions and Losses in Personnel, Colours, Standards and Artillery, 1792–1815. London: Greenhill Books. ISBN 1-85367-276-9.
