= Spanish ship San Francisco de Asis =

Several ships of the Spanish Navy have borne the name San Francisco de Asis, after Saint Francis of Assisi:

- San Francisco de Asis (1686), a 50-gun ship, deleted from Navy lists in 1689.
- San Francisco de Asis (1726), a 52-gun ship, broken up in 1741.
- San Francisco de Asis (1746), a 70-gun ship, burnt in 1748 to avoid capture.
- San Francisco de Asis (1767), a 74-gun ship. She was wrecked after the Battle of Trafalgar in 1805.
