= Johann Sigismund Riesch =

Austrian general (1750–1821)

Johann Sigismund Graf von Riesch
- Born: 2 August 1750; Vienna, Austria
- Died: 2 November 1821 (aged 71); Neschwitz, modern-day Germany
- Military career
- Allegiance: Austrian Empire
- Branch: Cavalry
- Service years: 1773–1810
- Rank: General of Cavalry
- Conflicts: War of the Bavarian Succession; Austro-Turkish War (1787-1791); French Revolutionary Wars; Napoleonic Wars
- Awards: Military Order of Maria Theresa, KC 1801
- Other work: Inhaber of Dragoon Regiment # 6

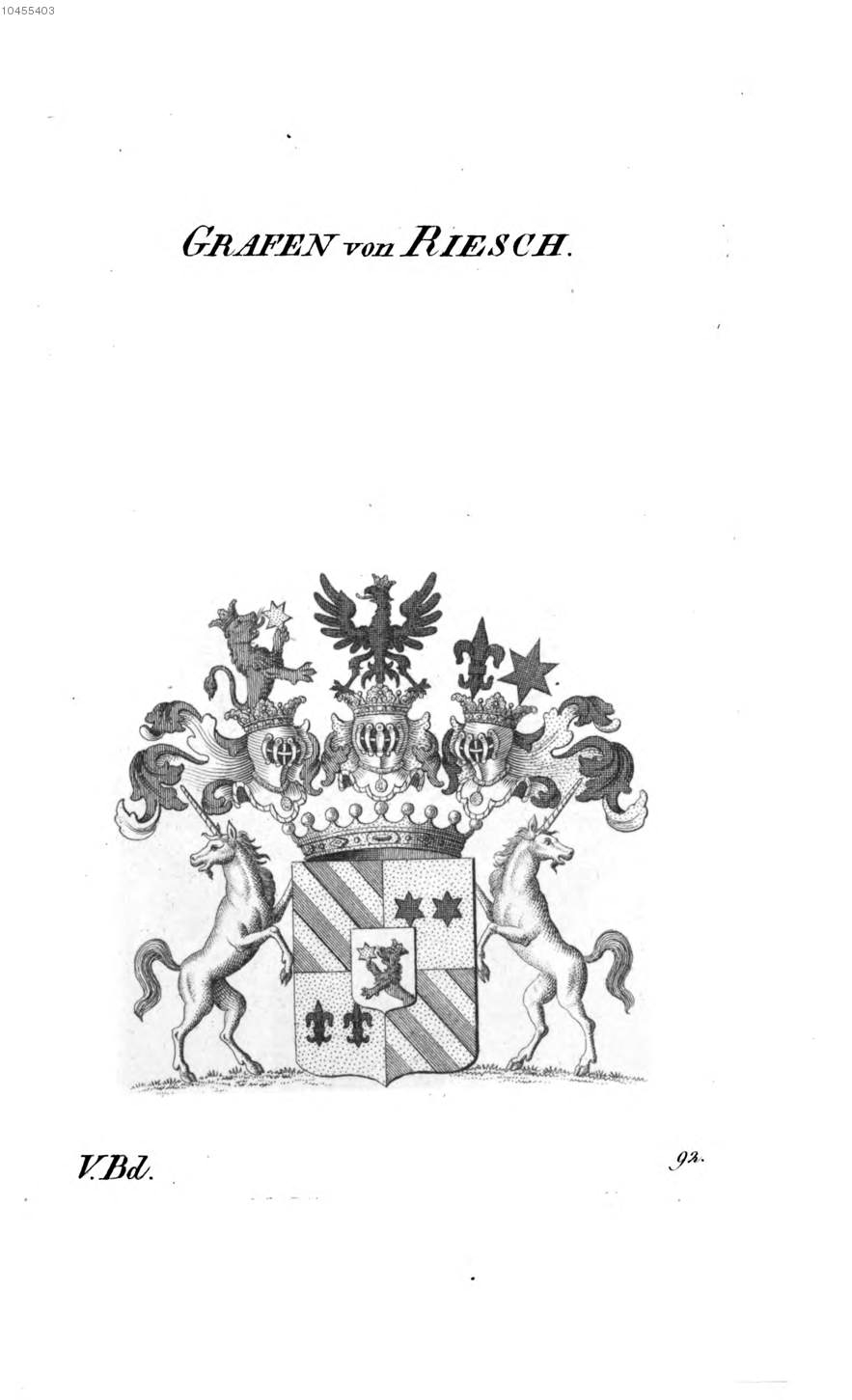
Arms of the Count von Riesch

Johann Sigismund Graf von Riesch (2 August 1750 – 2 November 1821) joined the army of Habsburg Austria as a cavalry officer and, during his career, fought against the Kingdom of Prussia, Ottoman Turkey, Revolutionary France, and Napoleon's French Empire. He became a general officer during the French Revolutionary Wars and held important commands during the War of the Second Coalition. He displayed a talent for leading cavalry formations, but proved less capable when given corps-sized commands. During the 1805 Ulm Campaign in the Napoleonic Wars, the French badly defeated his corps and forced it to surrender soon afterward. From 1806 to his death in 1821, he was the Proprietor (Inhaber) of an Austrian cavalry regiment.

== Early career ==
Born in Vienna on 2 August 1750 into a noble Saxon family, Riesch enlisted in the army of the Electorate of Saxony. In 1773 he switched to the Austrian army, joining the Chevauxleger Regiment # 1 as an Oberleutnant. He fought against the Prussians in the War of the Bavarian Succession in 1778–1779. During the Austro-Turkish War he received promotion to Oberst (colonel) of the Nassau-Usingen Cuirassier Regiment # 14. On 18 August 1788, he distinguished himself in battle against Turkish cavalry on the Timiş River in the Banat.

Riesch married Theresia Josephine Koháry in 1792. During the War of the First Coalition, he was wounded in action on 16 March 1793 at Tirlemont. In July of that year he received promotion to the rank of General-Major. In May 1794 he defeated a numerically superior force of French cavalry at Maubeuge. At the Battle of Fleurus on 26 June 1794, he led a brigade in the 1st Column consisting of two battalions of the Austrian Samuel Gyulai Infantry Regiment # 32, three French Émigré battalions in the Legions of Damas, Béon, and Mathieu, and two squadrons of the Béon Legion cavalry.

Emperor Francis II raised Riesch to the rank of Feldmarschall-Leutnant on 4 March 1796. That year found him serving in the Army of the Upper Rhine under Dagobert Sigmund von Wurmser and later under Maximilian Anton Karl, Count Baillet de Latour. Riesch led a small cavalry division in Archduke Charles' success at the Battle of Würzburg on 3 September 1796. The Coburg Dragoon Regiment # 37, Kaiser Hussar Regiment # 2, and the Münster Dragoon Regiment were placed under his orders. At the Battle of Neuwied, he and his cavalry ably covered the Austrian retreat after the French victory on 18 April 1797.

== War of the Second Coalition ==
Riesch helped win the First Battle of Stockach on 25 March 1799 by leading a brilliant cavalry charge that overthrew Jean-Joseph Ange d'Hautpoul's French cavalry reserve. For his Stockach exploit, he received the Knight's Cross of the Military Order of Maria Theresa in August 1801. He again commanded a cavalry division under Olivier, Count of Wallis at the First Battle of Zurich on 4 June. On this occasion, he led 12 squadrons of the Nassau-Usingen Cuirassiers # 9 and the Mack Cuirassiers # 10.

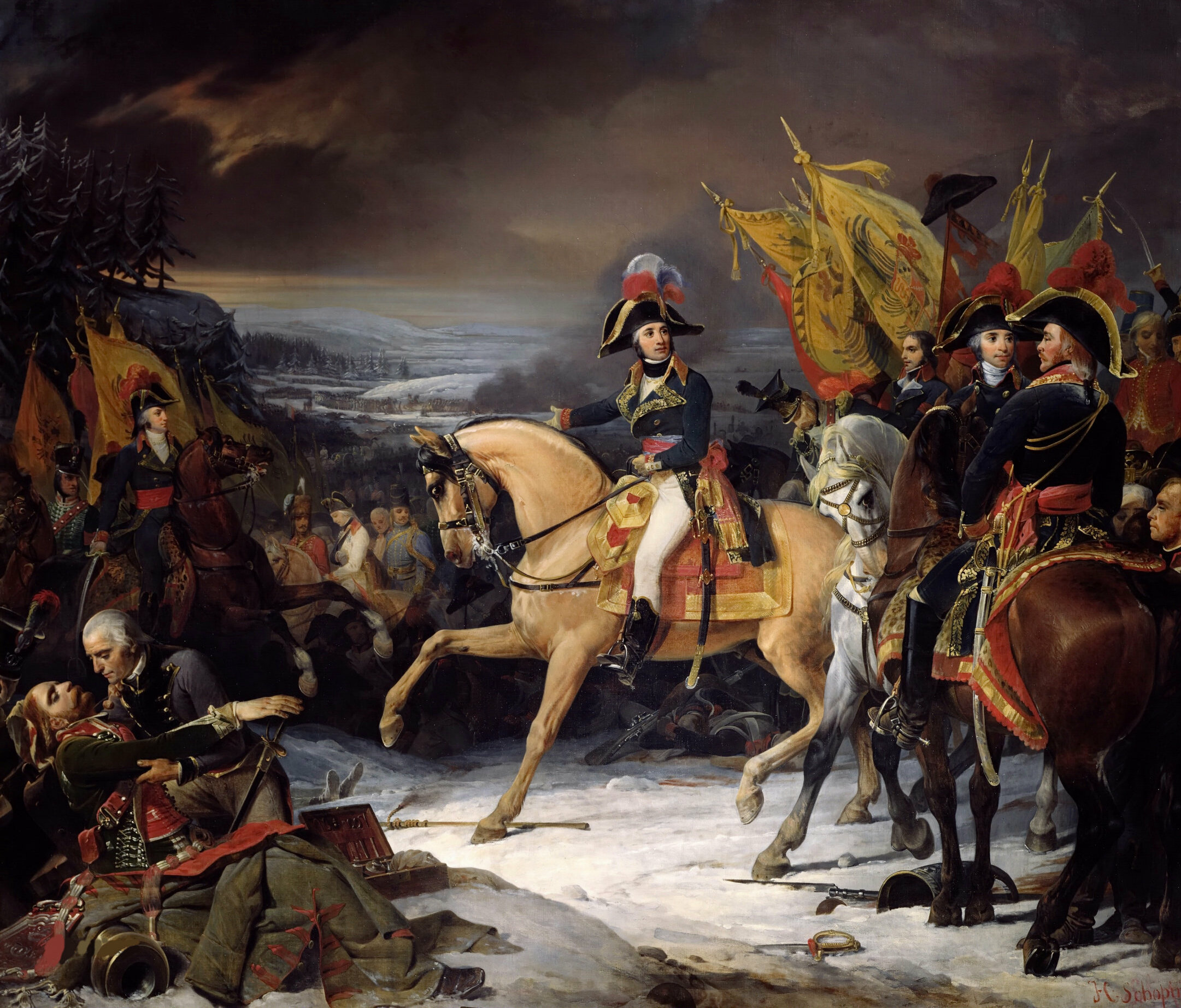
The Battle of Hohenlinden by Henri Frédéric Schopin, 1836

In the 1800 campaign in southern Germany, Riesch again led a cavalry division under Pál Kray at the Second Battle of Stockach on 3 May and at the Battle of Messkirch two days later. A string of Austrian defeats ended in an armistice that summer. In the interim, the emperor appointed the youthful Archduke John of Austria to lead the army. A cavalry specialist, Riesch found himself in command of a corps containing infantry, cavalry, and artillery. When the armistice lapsed in November, both armies rapidly moved into contact. Riesch and Ludwig Baillet de Latour led their commands against the French divisions of Michel Ney and Jean Hardÿ in the Battle of Ampfing on 1 December. The Austrians succeeded in driving their enemies back in bitter fighting, but paid for the victory with 3,100 casualties.

Two days later, Riesch's 13,000-man Left Column advanced against Jean Moreau's French army in the Battle of Hohenlinden. The 22,000-strong Left Center Column made rapid progress on the main highway while Riesch's men struggled along muddy forest trails in snowy weather. Because of the delay, Antoine Richepanse's flanking column passed across Riesch's front and crashed into the rear of Johann Kollowrat's Left Center column. Under the circumstances, Riesch might have punished the French soldiers, but he hesitated. After taking extra time to concentrate his column on the heights of Albaching, he unwisely proceeded to divide his force into a reserve and five task forces before advancing.

Riesch's men found themselves in a soldiers' battle amid woods and snow squalls, with the more aggressive French having the advantage. Charles Decaen's French division soon appeared on the scene to block Riesch's awkward attempts to break through to Kollowrat. Meanwhile, Richpanse, Ney, and Emmanuel Grouchy enveloped and crushed Kollowrat's isolated column. When Riesch heard of the disaster, he fell back. His own losses amounted to 900 men, and he brought off 500 French prisoners. Badly shaken by the disaster, Archduke John ordered a rapid withdrawal to distance his troops from the French.

During the chaotic retreat after Hohenlinden, Riesch clashed with his French pursuers at Rosenheim on 9 December. Outnumbered 10,000 to 6,000, his troops suffered 600 casualties while inflicting only 110 losses on the French. He commanded the rear guard in an unsuccessful action at Schwanenstadt on 18 December. Catching his troops with their backs to a river, Richepanse's cavalry forced 700 Austrian horsemen to surrender. By the time Archduke Charles replaced his brother John in command, the army was practically a rabble. Both sides agreed to a truce on 25 December 1800. Afterward, John heaped blame on Riesch for his slow march on the morning of Hohenlinden, but this may be unfair because the French movements were also slow due to the miserable road conditions.

== Napoleonic Wars ==
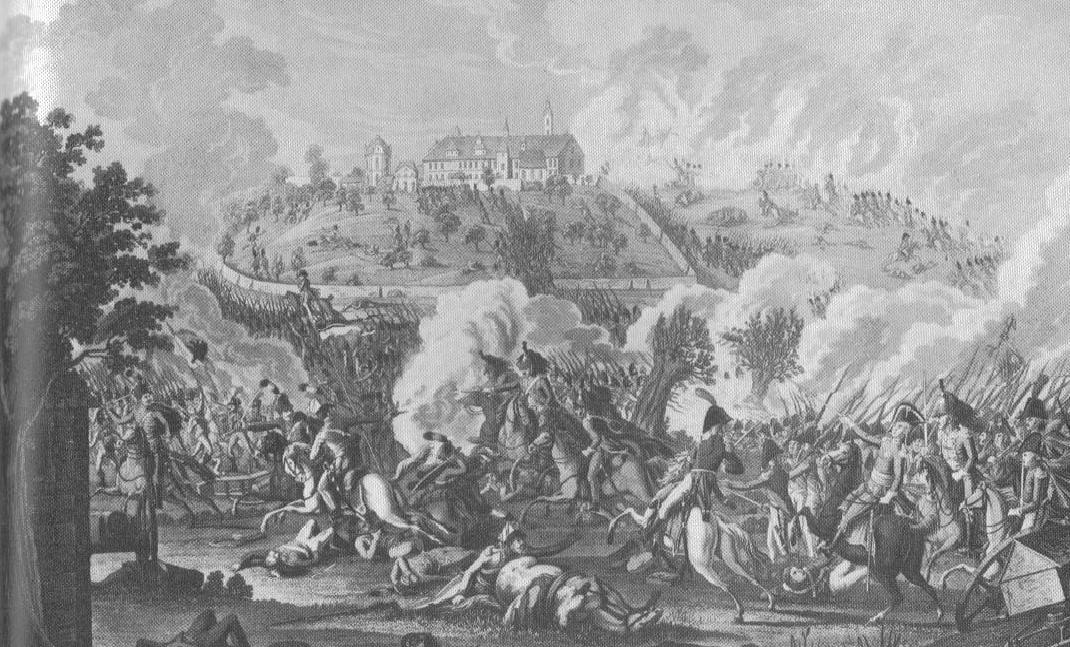
Battle of Elchingen from an engraving by Johann Lorenz Rugendas (1775-1826)

At the start of the War of the Third Coalition, the Austrian high command assigned Riesch to command a corps in Archduke Ferdinand and Karl Mack von Leiberich's army in southern Germany. In September and October 1805, Emperor Napoleon I enveloped the badly-led Austrian army with a greatly superior army. In attempting to escape the trap, Mack sent Franz von Werneck's corps to the northeast of Ulm and ordered Riesch to cover his right flank.

Riesch occupied the villages of Ober- and Unter-Elchingen on the north bank of the Danube River. At the Battle of Elchingen on 14 October 1805, Marshal Ney's superior force attacked Riesch's 9,000 soldiers, drove them off the heights, and forced them back into Ulm. During the battle, Riesch commanded two brigades under Daniel Mécsery and Johann Laudon, with 14 infantry battalions, 11 cavalry squadrons, and 12 artillery pieces. The main French attack came from the south, as Louis Henri Loison's division crossed a partly destroyed bridge over the river and went on to storm the Elchingen Abbey. Riesch fought back until a second French division approached from the east, when he ordered a retreat. Under pressure of cavalry attacks, Austrian morale collapsed and Riesch's command suffered very heavy losses. A few days later, Mack surrendered with 27,000 men, including Riesch, at the Battle of Ulm.

In June 1806, he became the proprietor of the Reisch Dragoon Regiment # 6 and held this position until his death. In 1809, he commanded the Reserve, but missed all the battles of the War of the Fifth Coalition. He retired from the army in 1810. In 1812 he married the 21-year-old Amalie Adelheid von Schönberg, his first wife having died in 1803. He died at his splendid estate, Barockschloss Neschwitz in Saxony, on 2 November 1821.

== Footnotes ==
Military offices
Preceded by Michael von Melas	Proprietor (Inhaber) of Dragoon Regiment # 6; 1806–1821	Succeeded by Carl Kinsky
