= Battle of Ulm =

1805 battle during the War of the Third Coalition

- Part of the Ulm campaign during the War of the Third Coalition
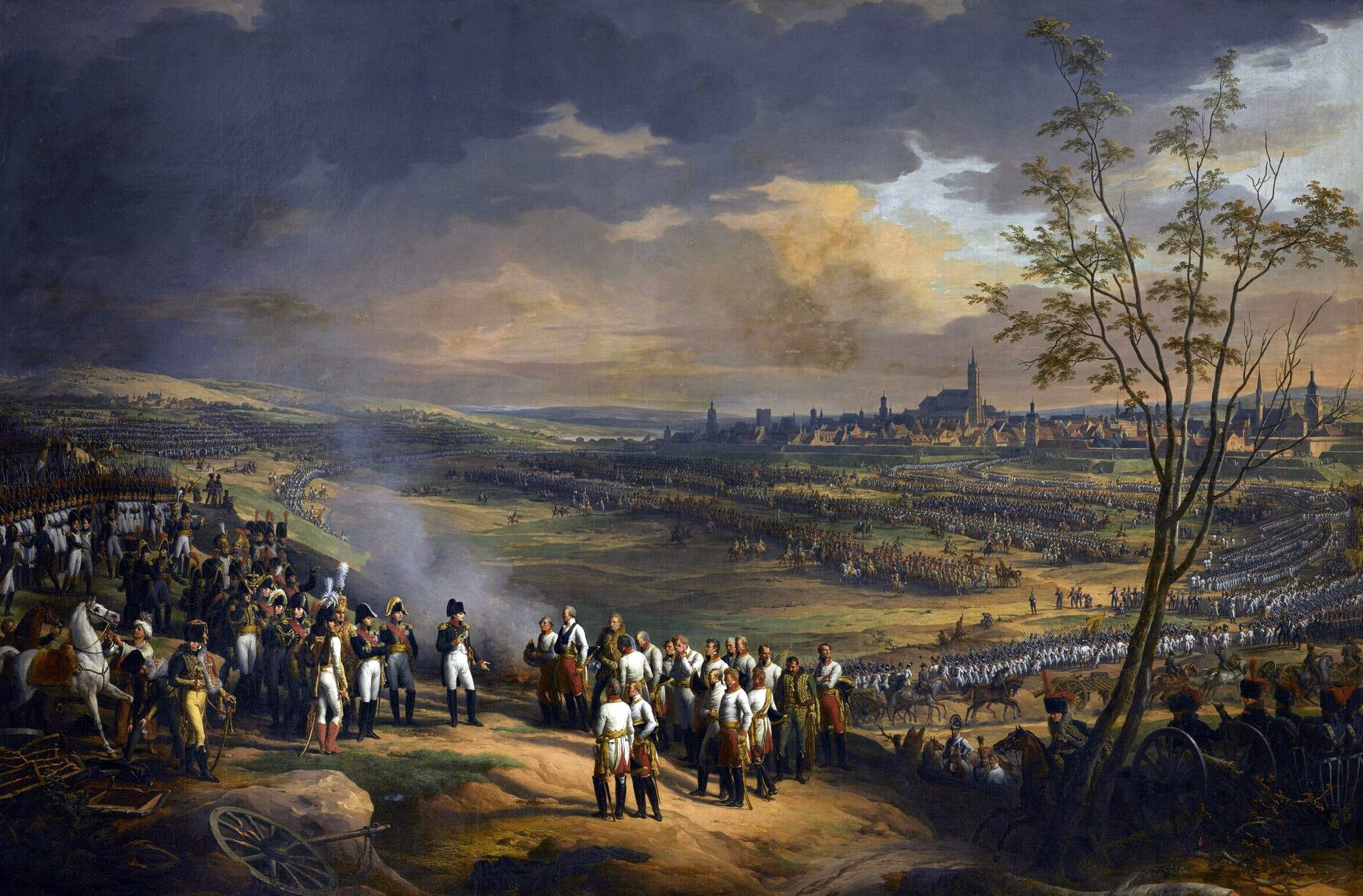
- The Capitulation of Ulm; Charles Thévenin, 1815
| Date | 16–20 October 1805 |
| Location | Ulm, Bavaria 48°23′00″N 9°59′00″E |
| Result | French victory |
| Territorial changes | France gains control over Bavaria |

Belligerents
| France | Austria |

Commanders and leaders
| Napoleon Bonaparte; Michel Ney | Karl Mack von Leiberich (surrendered) (POW); Johann I Joseph |

Strength
| 80,000 | 40,000 |

Casualties and losses
| 1,500 killed, wounded or captured | 4,000 killed or wounded 27,000 captured |
- Location within Europe

War of the Third Coalition:
Austria
current battle
Napoleon in command
Napoleon not in command

The Battle of Ulm on 16–20 October 1805 was a series of skirmishes, at the end of the Ulm campaign, which allowed Napoleon I to trap an entire Austrian army under the command of Karl Freiherr Mack von Leiberich with minimal losses and to force its surrender near Ulm in the Electorate of Bavaria.

== Background ==
In 1805, the United Kingdom, Austria, Sweden and Russia formed the Third Coalition against France. When the Bavarians allied with France, an Austrian army of 72,000 men under Karl Mack von Leiberich prematurely invaded Bavaria while the nearest Russian troops were still marching through Poland. The Austrians expected the main battles of the war to take place in northern Italy, not Germany, and intended only to protect the Alps from French forces.

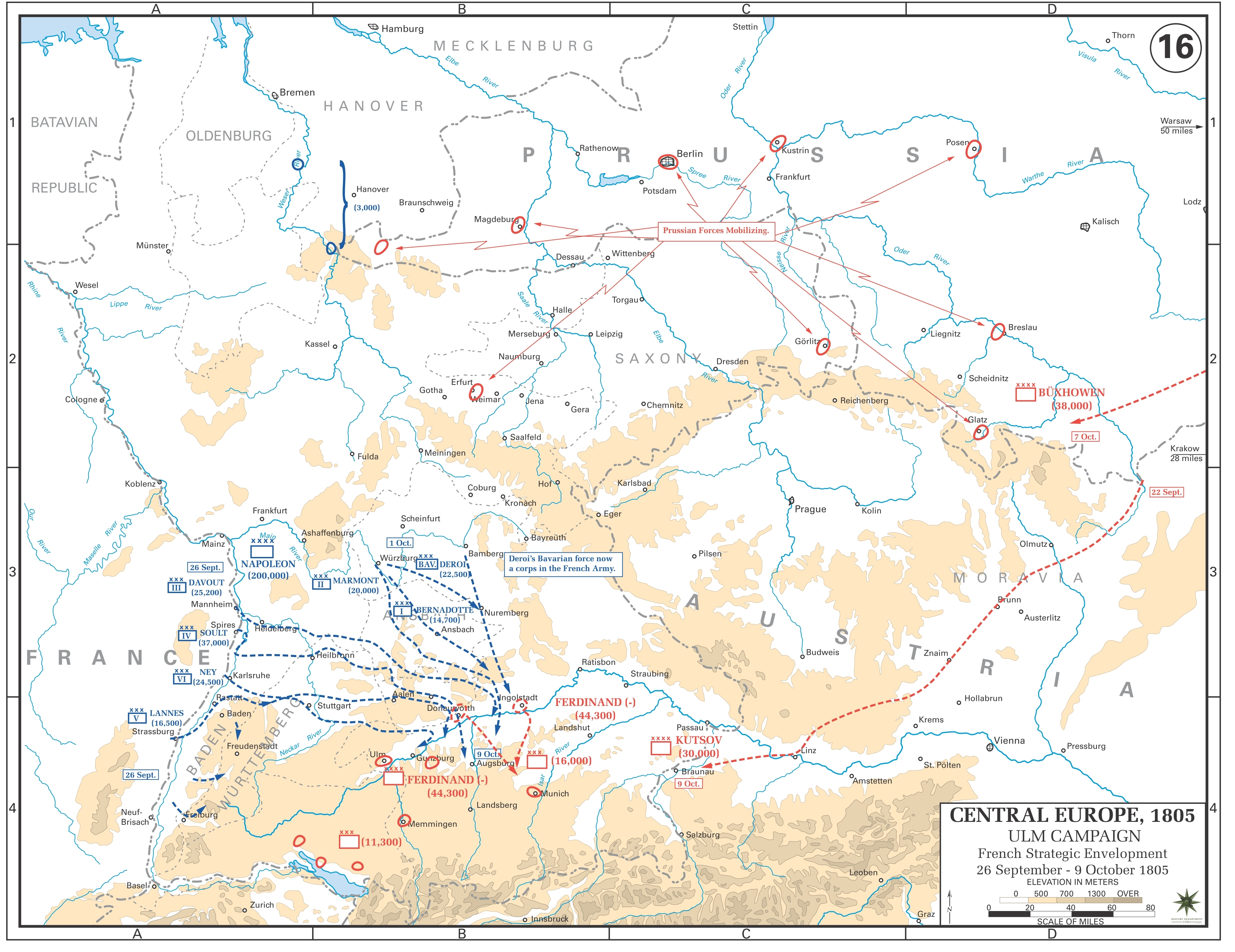
Map of the campaign, September–October 1805

A popular but apocryphal legend has it that while the Austrians used the Gregorian calendar, the Russians were still using the Julian calendar. This meant that their dates did not correspond, and the Austrians were brought into conflict with the French before the Russians could come into line. This simple but improbable explanation for the Russian army being far behind the Austrian is dismissed by scholar Frederick Kagan as "a bizarre myth".

Napoleon had 177,000 troops of the Grande Armée at Boulogne, ready to invade England. They marched south on 27 August and by 24 September were ready to cross the Rhine from Mannheim to Strasbourg. After crossing the Rhine, the greater part of the French army made a gigantic right wheel so that its corps reached the Danube simultaneously, facing south. On 7 October, Mack learned that Napoleon planned to cross the Danube and march around his right flank so as to cut him off from the Russians who were marching via Vienna. He accordingly changed front, placing his left at Ulm and his right at Rain, but the French went on and crossed the Danube at Neuburg, Donauwörth, and Ingolstadt. Unable to stop the French avalanche, Michael von Kienmayer's Austrian corps abandoned its positions along the river and fled to Munich.

On 8 October, Franz Xaver von Auffenberg's division was cut to pieces by Joachim Murat's Cavalry Corps and Jean Lannes' V Corps at the Battle of Wertingen. The following day, Mack attempted to cross the Danube and move north. He was defeated in the Battle of Günzburg by Jean-Pierre Firmin Malher's division of Michel Ney's VI Corps which was still operating on the north bank. During the action, the French seized a bridgehead on the south bank. After first withdrawing to Ulm, Mack tried to break out to the north. His army was blocked by Pierre Dupont de l'Etang's VI Corps division and some cavalry in the Battle of Haslach-Jungingen on 11 October.

By the 11th, Napoleon's corps were spread out in a wide net to snare Mack's army. Nicolas Soult's IV Corps reached Landsberg am Lech and turned east to cut off Mack from Tyrol. Jean-Baptiste Bernadotte's I Corps and Louis Nicolas Davout's III Corps converged on Munich. Auguste Marmont's II Corps was at Augsburg. Murat, Ney, Lannes, and the Imperial Guard began closing in on Ulm. Mack ordered the corps of Franz von Werneck to march northeast, while Johann Sigismund Riesch covered its right flank at Elchingen. The Austrian commander sent Franz Jellacic's corps south toward Tyrol and held the remainder of his army at Ulm.

== Battle ==
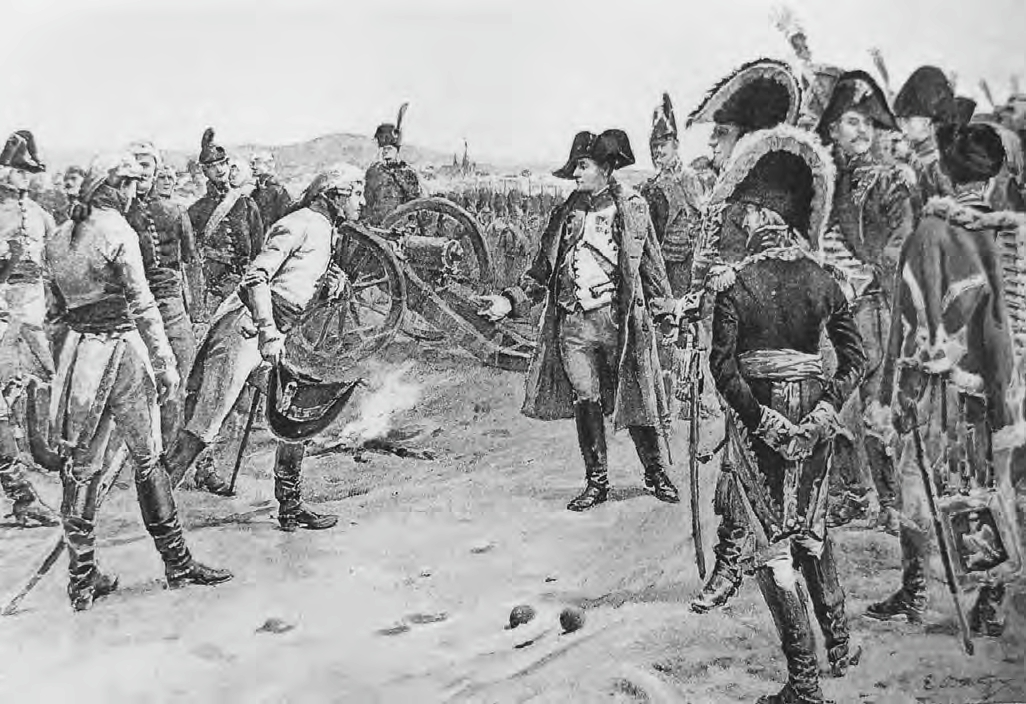
Mack surrenders to Napoleon at Ulm by Paul-Émile Boutigny

On 14 October, Ney crushed Riesch's small corps at the Battle of Elchingen and chased its survivors back into Ulm. Murat detected Werneck's force and raced in pursuit with his cavalry. Over the next few days, Werneck's corps was overwhelmed in a series of actions at Langenau, Herbrechtingen, Nördlingen, and Neresheim. On 18 October, he surrendered the remainder of his troops. Only Archduke Ferdinand Karl Joseph of Austria-Este and a few other generals escaped to Bohemia with about 1,200 cavalry. Meanwhile, Soult secured the surrender of 4,600 Austrians at Memmingen and swung north to box in Mack from the south. Jellacic slipped past Soult and escaped to the south only to be hunted down and captured in the Capitulation of Dornbirn in mid-November by Pierre Augereau's late-arriving VII Corps. By 16 October, Napoleon had surrounded Mack's entire army at Ulm, and four days later Mack surrendered with 25,000 men, 18 generals, 65 guns, and 40 standards.

Some 20,000 escaped, 10,000 were killed or wounded, and the rest made prisoner. About 500 French were killed and 1,000 wounded, a low number for such a decisive battle. In less than 15 days the Grande Armée neutralized 60,000 Austrians and 30 generals. At the surrender (known as the Convention of Ulm), Mack offered his sword and presented himself to Napoleon as "the unfortunate General Mack". Mack was court-martialed and sentenced to two years' imprisonment.

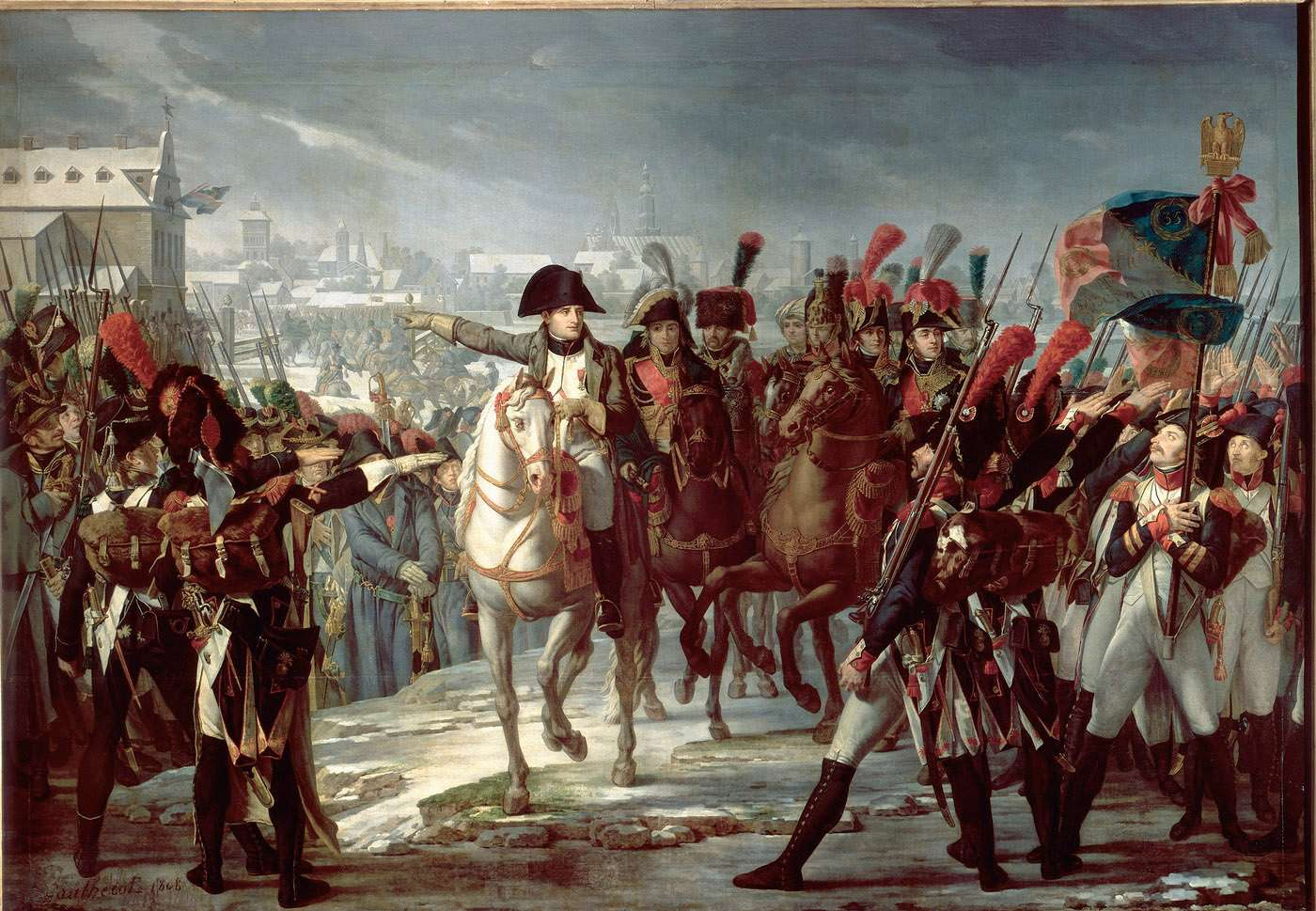
The II Corps in Augsburg.

== Aftermath and legacy ==
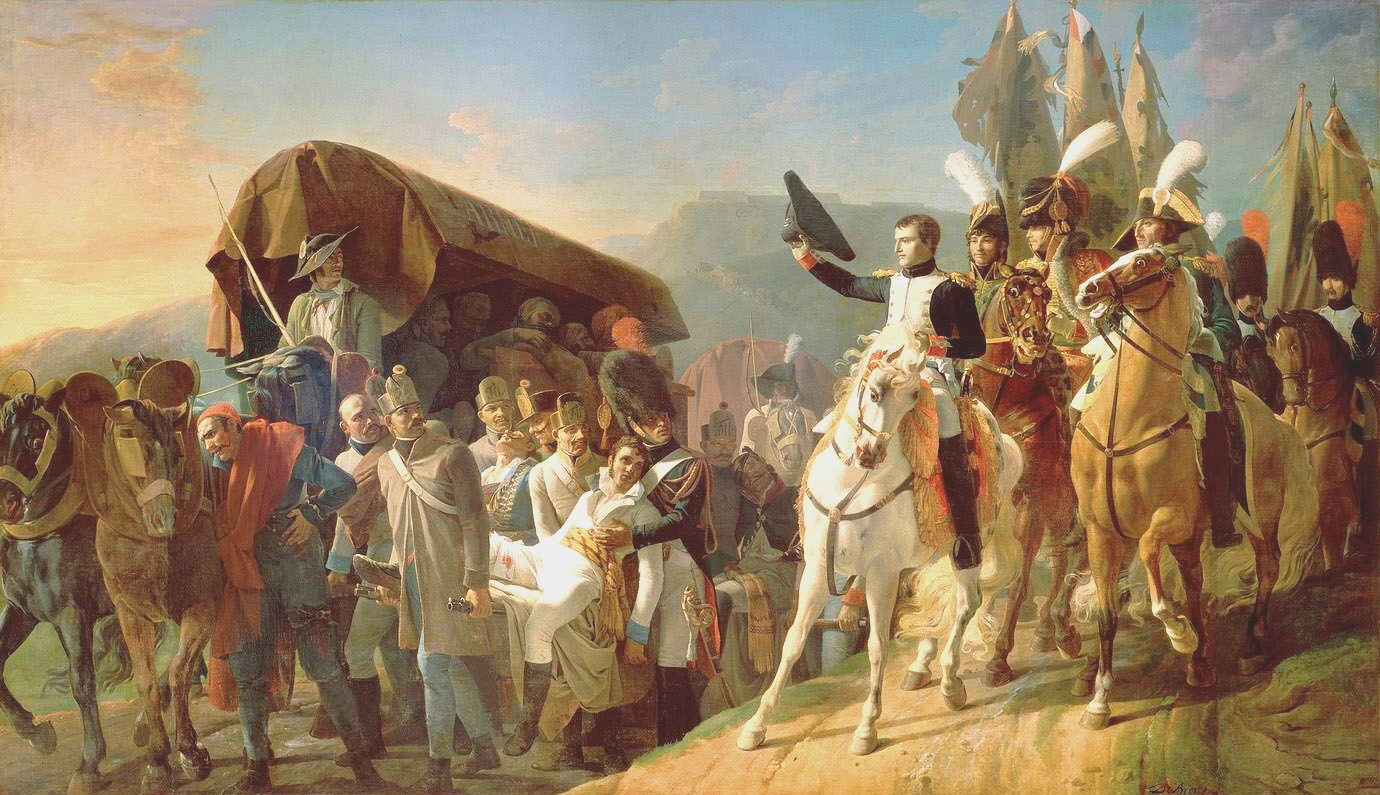
Napoleon saluting the wounded Austrians after their surrender.

The Austrian surrender enabled Napoleon's conquest of Vienna one month later. In his proclamation in the Bulletin de la Grande Armée of 21 October 1805 Napoleon said, "Soldiers, I announced to you a great battle, but, thanks to the bad combinations of the enemy, I have been able to obtain the same success, without running any risk[.]"

A victory obtained less by battle than by strategic maneuver with numerically superior forces, the Battle of Ulm and the Ulm campaign as a whole are, like the Battle of Austerlitz, still taught in military schools worldwide. The campaign would continue to influence military leaders for years, a notable example being the Schlieffen Plan that Germany employed at the start of World War I. Historians see Ulm as a model Napoleonic victory:

This campaign opened the most brilliant year of Napoleon's career. His army had been trained to perfection; his plans were faultless. Sweeping through Western Europe on a wide front, he concentrated the magnificent machine on Mack's line of communications in one of the finest historical examples of a turning movement. Ulm was not a battle; it was a strategic victory so complete and so overwhelming that the issue was never seriously contested in tactical combat.

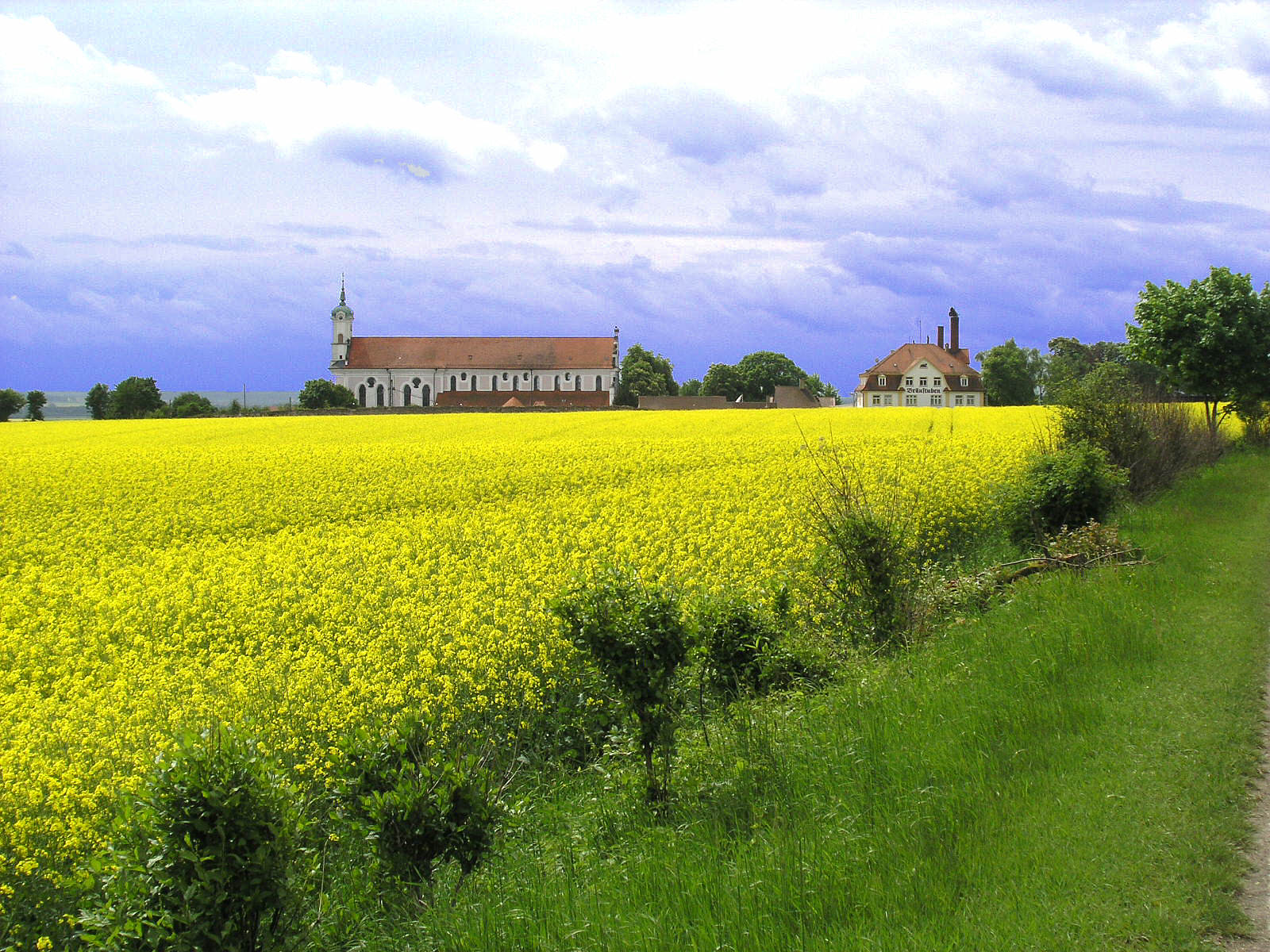
Site of the Battle of Elchingen on October 14, near the monastery of Elchingen

== Notes ==
| Preceded by Battle of Elchingen | Napoleonic Wars; Battle of Ulm | Succeeded by Battle of Verona (1805) |
