= Franz von Werneck =

Austrian general (1748–1806)

Franz Freiherr von Werneck
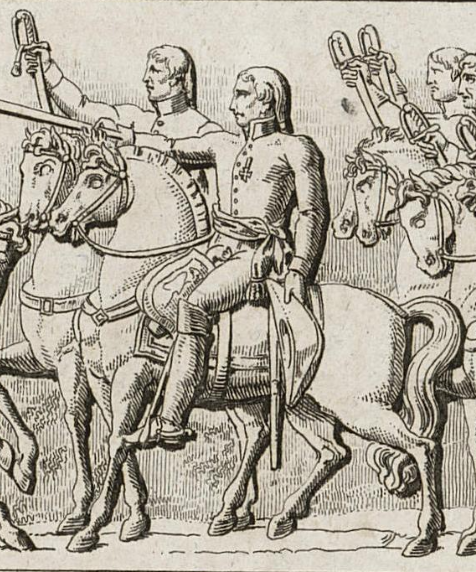
- Franz von Werneck (by P.-N. Bergeret, 1822)
- Born: 13 October 1748; Stuttgart, Duchy of Württemberg, modern-day Germany
- Died: 17 January 1806 (aged 57) Hradec Králové, modern-day Czech Republic
- Allegiance: Habsburg Monarchy; Austrian Empire
- Branch: Infantry
- Service years: 1764–1806
- Rank: Feldmarschallleutnant
- Conflicts: Austro-Turkish War (1788–1791); Siege of Belgrade (1789); War of the First Coalition; Siege of Thionville (1792); Battle of Jemappes (1792); Battle of Neerwinden (1793); Siege of Valenciennes (1793); Siege of Dunkirk (1793); Battle of Le Cateau (1794); Battle of Tourcoing (1794); Battle of Mainz (1795); Battle of Pfeddersheim (1795); Battle of Würzburg (1796); Battle of Neuwied (1797); War of the Third Coalition; Ulm campaign (1805)
- Awards: Military Order of Maria Theresa, KC 1790, CC 1796

Franz Freiherr von Werneck (13 October 1748 – 17 January 1806), joined the army of Habsburg Austria in 1764 and fought in the Austro-Turkish War from which he emerged as a general officer. During the French Revolutionary Wars, he had a distinguished career until 1797, when he was dismissed for losing a battle. He was reinstated only to surrender his command in 1805 during the War of the Third Coalition and was later brought up on charges. He died while awaiting a court-martial.

== Early career ==
Born in the Württemberg royal residence on 13 October 1748, (Note: The implication is that Werneck was the illegitimate offspring of a Württemberg prince, but Smith & Kudrna do not state this.) Werneck entered the service of Habsburg Austria in 1764 as an Oberleutnant in the Weid-Runkel Infantry Regiment Nr. 28. Shortly afterward, he transferred to the Stain Infantry Regiment Nr. 50 as a Hauptmann (captain) where he served for 20 years. Werneck became the regiment's Oberst (colonel) in 1784, replacing Prince George of Waldeck. He was succeeded in command of the regiment by Ludwig Sebottendorf. During the Austro-Turkish War, Werneck led his troops in the first of several actions at Slatina-Timiş on 13 September 1788, where he captured a hill. The following year he fought at Mehadia. Werneck made his reputation on 30 September 1789 while leading the 1st Assault Column at the Siege of Belgrade. On this occasion his command included a battalion of the Stain Regiment, a battalion of grenadiers, and a company of volunteers. After the siege was successfully concluded, Francis II, Holy Roman Emperor appointed him Generalmajor on 9 October 1789 with rank from 24 September 1789. He was decorated with the Knight's Cross of the Military Order of Maria Theresa on 19 December 1790.

== French Revolutionary Wars ==
After the outbreak of the War of the First Coalition, Werneck participated in the unsuccessful Siege of Thionville in September 1792. He served as a brigade commander in the Artillery Reserve under Olivier, Count of Wallis. Werneck led a contingent of grenadiers with distinction at the Battle of Jemappes on 6 November 1792. (Note: Smith & Kudrna named Werneck as a brigade commander at Jemappes, but Werneck is not listed in Smith's detailed Jemappes order of battle (Smith, p. 31).) In December 1792, Pierre de Ruel, marquis de Beurnonville led 20,000 French troops to overrun the Electorate of Trier. He was opposed by a force commanded by Friedrich Wilhelm, Fürst zu Hohenlohe-Kirchberg. The defenders were surrounded by 4 December, but thereafter they repelled repeated French attacks. In this stage of the fighting, Werneck commanded the Reserve at Grevenmacher which included single battalions of the Matheson Infantry Regiment Nr. 42 and Murray Infantry Regiment Nr. 55, plus two squadrons of the Latour Chevau-léger Regiment Nr. 31. By 17 December, the French effort collapsed and Beurnonville's army melted away.

Werneck was present at Aldenhoven on 1 March 1793 where Henri Christian Michel de Stengel's column was defeated by two Austrian cavalry regiments. He fought in the Battle of Neerwinden on 18 March. He served at the successful Siege of Valenciennes from 25 May to 27 July and at the failed Siege of Dunkirk from 24 August to 8 September. He led a brigade in József Alvinczi's Reserve at the Battle of Le Cateau on 29 March 1794. At the Battle of Tourcoing on 17–18 May 1794, Werneck led a brigade in Column No. 2 under Rudolf Ritter von Otto. On the first day, only the columns of the Duke of York and Otto reached their targets. The French counterattack on the second day mauled both columns and forced them to retreat.

Promoted to Feldmarschall-Leutnant on 28 May 1794, Werneck served in the army of William, Hereditary Prince of Orange. During the Siege of Nijmegen (27 October–8 November), the Duke of York and François Sébastien de Croix de Clerfayt tried to work out a plan to drive back the French using Werneck's 7,000 men. However, Nijmegen fell too quickly to the French and Werneck's operation was abandoned. In 1795 Werneck led troops in Clerfayt's army on the middle Rhine. The actions included the Battle of Mainz on 29 October, where he led the Reserve, and the Battle of Pfeddersheim on 10 November.

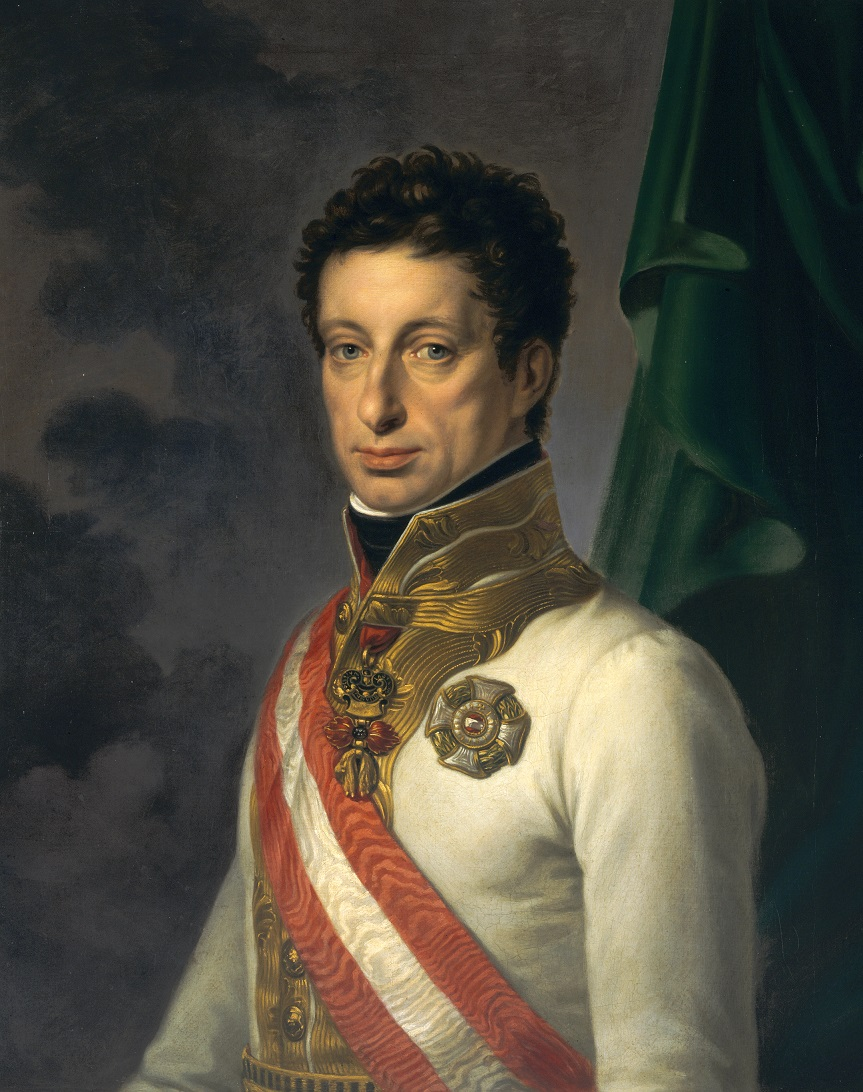
Werneck served under Archduke Charles in 1796.

Werneck served in Archduke Charles, Duke of Teschen's brilliant Rhine Campaign of 1796. At the Battle of Würzburg on 3 September 1796, he led a division of 12 grenadier battalions in Wilhelm von Wartensleben's Reserve. His brigade commanders were Johann Kollowrat, Joseph von Schellenberg, and Ludwig von Vogelsang. On 18 September he was awarded the Commander's Cross of the Military Order of Maria Theresa. When Charles took troops to join Maximilian Anton Karl, Count Baillet de Latour, Werneck was left in command of the independent Army of the Lower Rhine beginning in September. His position remained unmolested by the French during the winter. On 18 April 1797, Lazare Hoche and 38,000 French troops from the Army of Sambre-et-Meuse caught Werneck's 21,000 Austrians by surprise in the Battle of Neuwied. After heavy fighting, his soldiers were driven from the field with losses of about 1,000 killed and wounded, plus 3,000 captured. In addition, 24 artillery pieces, 60 wagons, and five colors were captured by the French. Total French losses were 2,000. On 17 April, when Jean Etienne Championnet's division threatened Werneck's right wing, the Austrian general weakened his left under Pál Kray in order to bolster his right. When the divisions of Paul Grenier and François Joseph Lefebvre began crossing the Rhine at 3:00 AM, Werneck hurriedly ordered Kray's troops back to defend his left. Lefebvre defeated the Austrian left flank, while Grenier broke through Kray's line of redoubts at Heddersdorf after repeated assaults. Hoche's offensive forced the Austrians into a deep withdrawal which ended only with news of the Treaty of Leoben. After the defeat, Werneck was placed in retirement on half-pay.

== Napoleonic Wars ==
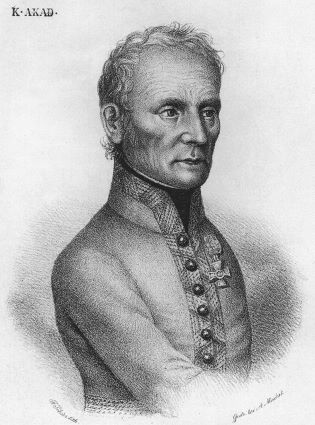
Mack led the Austrian army to disaster in 1805.

At the start of the War of the Third Coalition in 1805, Werneck was reactivated and appointed to the army in Germany. Despite some attempts at reform, the Austrian army remained wedded to 18th-century concepts of warfare. The army's brigades and divisions were only semi-permanent units, and corps-sized formations were organized on an ad hoc basis. There were no corps and division staffs such as existed in the French army, which had permanent brigades, divisions, and corps. The French armies had won notable victories in 1800, but under Emperor Napoleon I of France they were even more powerful and effective in 1805. To Austria's greater disadvantage, the nominal army commander, Archduke Ferdinand Karl Joseph of Austria-Este was at odds with his deputy, Karl Mack von Lieberich. The archduke and Mack's chief of staff Anton Mayer von Heldensfeld wanted to halt at the Lech River as originally planned, while Mack desired to keep marching to the Iller River at Ulm. After Emperor Francis I of Austria upheld Mack and sacked Mayer, the Austrian army began concentrating on the Iller. The flanks were held by Franz Jellacic's 11,000 troops near Lake Constance and Michael von Kienmayer's 12,000 men at Ingolstadt on the Danube.

While Jean Lannes's V Corps and Joachim Murat's Cavalry Corps moved directly east on Ulm, the rest of Napoleon's army swept past Ulm on the north bank of the Danube in the Ulm campaign. Crossing the river to the east of the Austrians, the French I, II, III, IV, and VI Corps got between Ulm and Vienna. Austrian defeats at the battles of Wertingen and Günzburg followed on 8 and 9 October. A breakout attempt failed on 11 October at the Battle of Haslach-Jungingen. Finally, on 13 October, Mack ordered Werneck to march his corps northeast from Ulm in order to escape from the trap. Werneck's south flank was covered by Johann Sigismund Riesch's corps which held Elchingen. Archduke Ferdinand fled from Ulm with some cavalry.

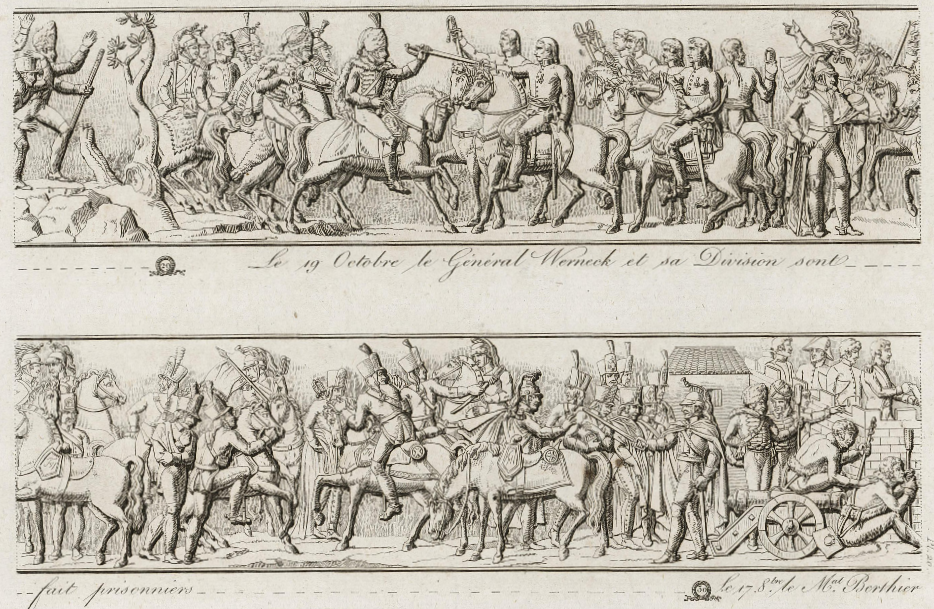
Surrender of general von Werneck on 19th October 1805 (by P.-N. Bergeret, 1822)

Michel Ney's VI Corps smashed Riesch on 14 October in the Battle of Elchingen and forced the survivors to retreat to Ulm. Murat set out in pursuit of Werneck. On 16 October, there was a clash between Ney's cavalry and Prince Friedrich Franz Xaver of Hohenzollern-Hechingen's division at Langenau. Murat caught a 5,000-man brigade under Rudolf Sinzendorf at Herbrechtingen on 17 October and wiped out half of it. On the same day, Ferdinand's cavalry fought off the French cavalry at Nördlingen, and there was another clash with Werneck's troops at Neresheim. Murat and Ney with 28,000 troops cornered their adversary on 19 October at the hamlet of Trochtelfingen. (Note: This place is located on Highway 29 just west of Nördlingen. It is not the town of Trochtelfingen, which is 55 km (34 mi) west of Ulm.) On that day Werneck capitulated with 15,000 troops, 28 guns, 12 colors, two standards, and four generals. Murat demanded that the terms include nearby Austrian units and Werneck complied. Because of this the artillery reserve also surrendered. Hohenzollern refused to join in the capitulation and got away with 10 squadrons of cavalry. Ferdinand also managed to escape to Bohemia with Karl Philipp, Prince of Schwarzenberg and 12 squadrons of horsemen. On 20 October Mack surrendered in the Battle of Ulm with 20,000 infantry, over 3,000 cavalry, and 59 guns.

For his surrender, charges were brought against Werneck. On 17 January 1806, he died of a stroke while awaiting court-martial at the fortress town of Hradec Králové (Königgrätz).

== Family ==
Werneck's brother Reinhard von Werneck briefly joined the Austrian military before transferring to the army of the Electorate of Bavaria. In between his military duties, he became noted as a gardener.

== Notes ==
Footnotes

Citations

Military offices
Preceded by Prince George of Waldeck	Oberst of Stain Infantry Regiment Nr. 50; 1784–1789	Succeeded by Ludwig Sebottendorf
