= Spanish ship San Francisco de Asis (1767) =

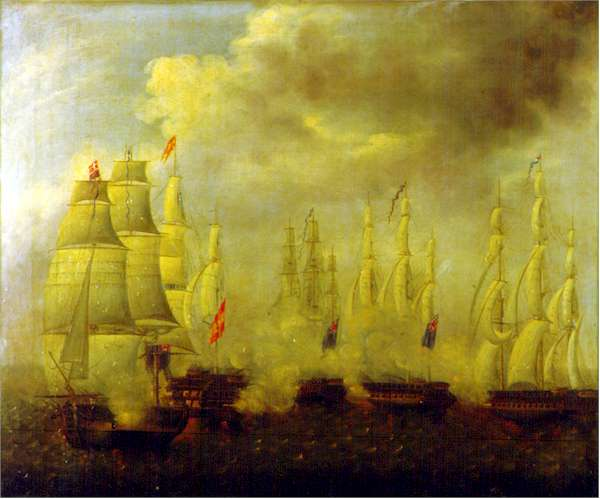
- Battle between the Spanish ship of line San Francisco de Asís and three British frigates and a sloop during the action of 25 January 1797.

History

Spanish flag 1748-1785 Spanish flag 1785-1873
- Name: San Francisco de Asis
- Namesake: Saint Francis of Assisi
- Launched: Guarnizo (Cantabria), 1767
- Fate: Wrecked 23 October 1805

General characteristics
- Class & type: 74-gun third rate

San Francisco de Asis was a 74-gun ship of the line of the Spanish Navy launched in 1767 from the royal shipyard in Guarnizo, Cantabria. She was wrecked after the Battle of Trafalgar in 1805 near Puerto de Santa Maria.

== History ==
On January 25, 1797, San Francisco de Asis, under the command of Captain Alonso de Torres y Guerra, was on patrol off the coast of Cádiz for the protection of Spanish ships arriving with goods from America when it was attacked by a British Royal Navy squadron consisting of three frigates and a corvette. San Francisco de Asis engaged the squadron and forced them to withdraw after a fierce engagement. She was repaired and on February 14 of that same year took part in the Spanish defeat at the Battle of Cape St. Vincent.

In 1805, San Francisco de Asis participated in the Battle of Trafalgar under the command of Captain Luis Antonio Flores. She did not perform much because of her unfavorable position in the course of the battle. After the battle and after repairing some of the damage inflicted to San Francisco de Asis, she went out again with several Spanish and French ships to try to recapture warships captured by the British, managing to recapture the Santa Ana and Neptuno. However, San Francisco de Asis was wrecked on the coast of Puerto de Santa María as a result of the storm that followed the battle. The number of casualties she had were 5 men killed and 12 wounded.

== Bibliography ==
- Adkin, Mark (2005). The Trafalgar Companion: A Guide to History's Most Famous Sea Battle and the Life of Admiral Lord Nelson. Aurum. ISBN 1-84513-018-9.
- Adkins, Roy (2004). Trafalgar: The Biography of a Battle. Little, Brown. ISBN 0-316-72511-0.
- Clayton, Tim & Craig, Phil (2004). Trafalgar: The Men, the Battle, the Storm. Hodder & Stoughton. ISBN 0-340-83026-3.
- Fremont-Barnes, Gregory (2005). Trafalgar 1805: Nelson's Crowning Victory. Campaign. Vol. 157. Osprey Publishing. ISBN 1-84176-892-8.
- Goodwin, Peter (2005). The Ships of Trafalgar: The British, French and Spanish Fleets October 1805. Naval Institute Press. ISBN 1-59114-824-3.
- John D. Harbron Trafalgar and the Spanish Navy (1988) ISBN 0-87021-695-3
- Winfield, Rif; Tredrea, John M; García-Torralba Pérez, Enrique & Blasco Felip, Manuel (2023). Spanish Warships in the Age of Sail 1700—1860: Design, Construction, Careers and Fates. Barnsley, UK: Seaforth Publishing. ISBN 978-1-5267-9078-1.
