= Battle of Würzburg =

1796 battle during the War of the First Coalition

The Battle of Würzburg
- Part of the 1796 Rhine campaign during the War of the First Coalition
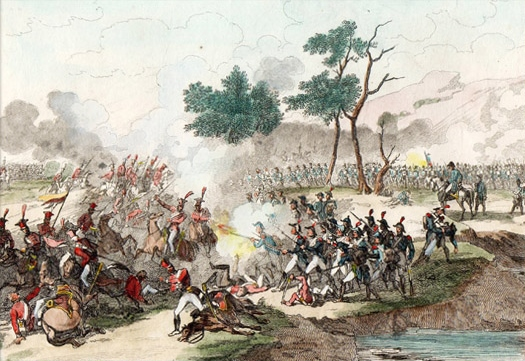
- Battle of Würzburg by Martinet and Branche, 1837
Date	3 September 1796
Location	Würzburg, present-day Germany 49°47′36″N 9°55′46″E
Result	Austrian victory

Belligerents
Republican France	(Holy Roman Empire) Habsburg monarchy

Commanders and leaders
(France) Jean-Baptiste Jourdan	(Holy Roman Empire) Archduke Charles

Strength
30,000	30,000

Casualties and losses
3,000, 7 guns	1,500
- Location within Europe

The Battle of Würzburg was fought on 3 September 1796 between an army of the Habsburg monarchy led by Archduke Charles, Duke of Teschen and an army of the French First Republic led by Jean-Baptiste Jourdan. The French attacked the archduke's forces, but they were resisted until the arrival of reinforcements decided the engagement in favor of the Austrians. The French retreated west toward the Rhine River. The action occurred during the War of the First Coalition, part of the French Revolutionary Wars. Würzburg is 95 kilometres (59 mi) southeast of Frankfurt.

The summer of 1796 saw the two French armies of Jourdan and Jean Victor Marie Moreau advance into southern Germany. They were opposed by Archduke Charles, who supervised two weaker Austrian armies commanded by Wilhelm von Wartensleben and Maximilian Anton Karl, Count Baillet de Latour. At the Battle of Amberg on 24 August, Charles managed to concentrate superior numbers against Jourdan, forcing him to withdraw. At Würzburg, Jourdan attempted a counterattack in a bid to halt his retreat. After his defeat, Charles forced Jourdan's army back to the Rhine. With his colleague in retreat, Moreau was isolated and compelled to abandon southern Germany.

== Battle ==
The French army advanced against what they thought to be an isolated Austrian division under Feldmarschall-Leutnant Anton Sztáray. Jourdan's plan was to attack Sztáray with the divisions of Generals of Division Jean-Baptiste Bernadotte and Jean Étienne Championnet, leaving the divisions of Generals of Division Jacques Bonnaud and Paul Grenier in reserve. However, the early morning mist enabled Archduke Charles to bring up the division of Feldmarschall-Leutnant Friedrich Freiherr von Hotze as a reinforcement to Sztáray, effectively undoing what Jourdan thought to be a great numerical superiority for the French.

Jourdan's imagined superiority diminished even more when the division of General-Major Anton von Elsnitz to the north kept the much larger force under General of Division François Joseph Lefebvre out of the battle. Meanwhile, Austrian engineers were laying pontoon bridges over the Main in order to let the remainder of the Habsburg army cross the river. The French attacked the Austrian position without success until the Austrian divisions of Feldmarschall-Leutnant Paul Kray and Feldzeugmeister Wilhelm von Wartensleben arrived and drove the French off the field.

== Result ==
=== Army of the Lower Rhine ===
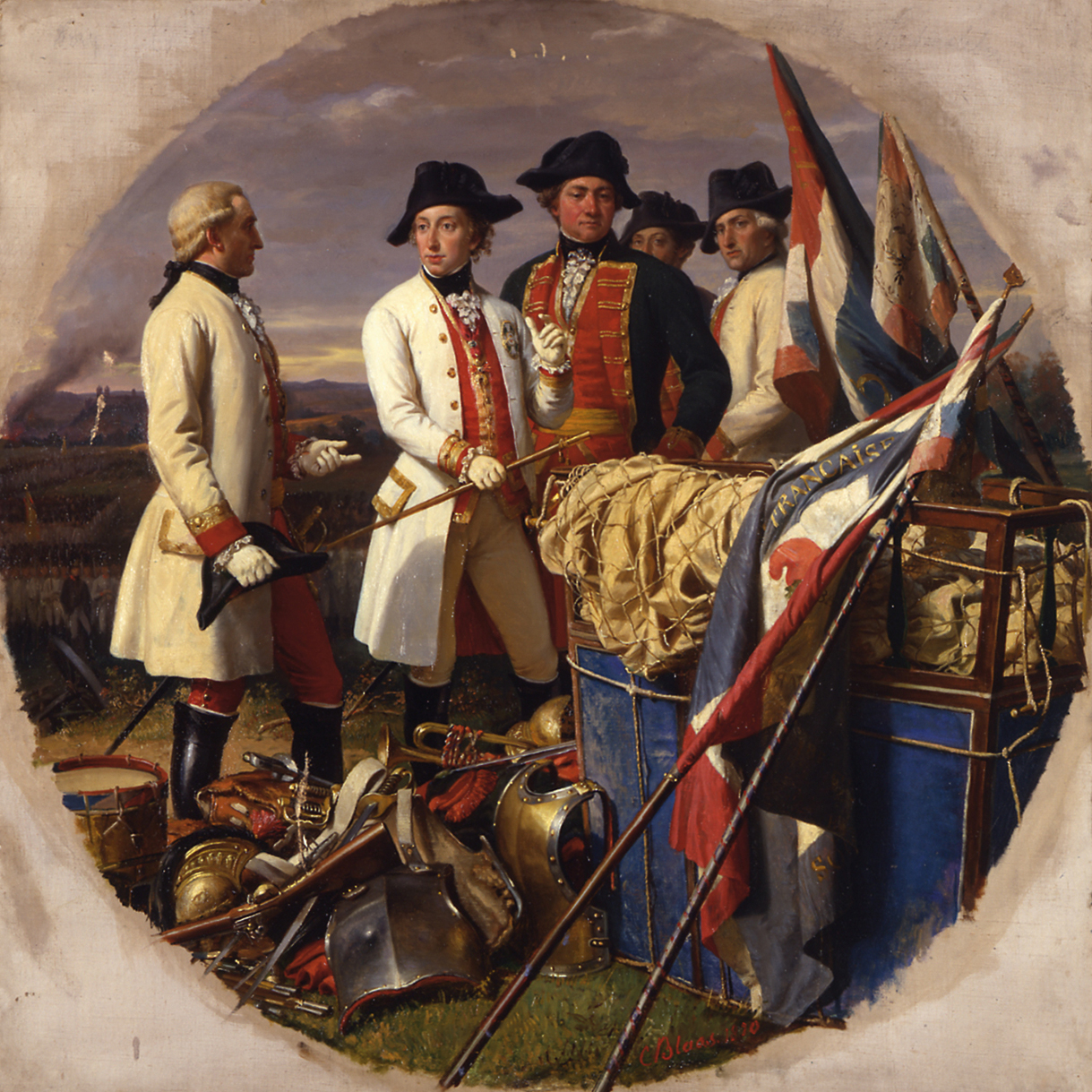
Battle of Würzburg by Karl von Blaas, 1870

The French suffered 2,000 killed and wounded, plus 1,000 men and 7 guns captured. The Austrians lost 1,200 killed and wounded, with 300 captured. The Battle of Würzburg determined the winner of the 1796 campaign in southern Germany. Charles pursued the beaten French, turning Jourdan's south flank and keeping between him and General of Division Jean Victor Marie Moreau's French Army of Rhin-et-Moselle in southern Germany.

On 7 September, Charles forced the French to lift the siege of Mainz. By 16 September, the opposing armies were back on the Lahn River where they started the campaign in June. On that day, Kray with 11,000 Austrians defeated 15,000 Frenchmen of Jourdan's army at Limburg an der Lahn. The French general fell back to Düsseldorf and crossed to the west bank of the Rhine. The French gave up their siege of the Ehrenbreitstein fortress on 17 September. Charles left 30,000 soldiers with the Army of the Lower Rhine, placed them under the command Feldmarschall-Leutnant Franz von Werneck, and hurried south.

=== Army of the Upper Rhine ===
Having disposed of Jourdan's army, the Austrian archduke forced Moreau's now-isolated army to retreat west through the Black Forest to France. On 18 September, an Austrian division under Feldmarschall-Leutnant Franz Petrasch stormed the Rhine bridgehead at Kehl, but was driven out by a French counterattack. At this time, Moreau's army was still south of Ulm. On 2 October, Moreau defeated Feldzeugmeister Maximilian Anton Karl, Count Baillet de Latour's Army of the Upper Rhine at the Battle of Biberach. While French casualties numbered only 500, they inflicted 300 killed and wounded, while capturing 4,000 soldiers and 18 cannon. This slowed the southern Austrian pursuit, but with Charles rushing south to cut him off from France, Moreau retreated to the Rhine.

On 19 October, Moreau with 32,000 soldiers fought Charles with 28,000 Austrians at the Battle of Emmendingen. The French suffered 1,000 killed and wounded, including General of Division Michel de Beaupuy killed. In addition, the Austrians captured 1,800 men and 2 cannons. The Austrians losses totaled 1,000, including Feldzeugmeister Wilhelm von Wartensleben killed.

The French withdrew south and fought the Battle of Schliengen on 24 October. This time, the Austrians lost 800 while inflicting 1,200 casualties on the French. Both sides claimed victory, but Moreau retreated to the west bank of the Rhine. Moreau soon offered Charles an armistice, which the field marshal wanted to accept. At this time, the Austrian government made a huge error by refusing to ratify the agreement. That fall and winter, while Charles reduced the fortresses of Kehl and Huningen, the French government transferred 14 demi-brigades from Moreau to General of Division Napoleon Bonaparte to help the latter bring the Siege of Mantua to a successful conclusion.

== Order of battle ==
=== French Army ===
- Army of Sambre-et-Meuse: General of Division Jean-Baptiste Jourdan
- 25,000 infantry, 5,000 cavalry, 11 artillery batteries
  - Division: General of Division François Joseph Lefebvre
  - Division: General of Division Paul Grenier
  - Division: General of Division Jean Étienne Championnet
  - Division: General of Division Jean-Baptiste Bernadotte
  - Cavalry Reserve: General of Division Jacques Philippe Bonnaud

=== Austrian Army ===
- Army of the Lower Rhine: Feldmarschall Archduke Charles (30,000)

(Austrian Cavalry Regiments were numbered in a single series by seniority)

  - Feldmarschall-Leutnant Hotze:
    - General-Major Michael von Kienmayer:

Tyrol Jager (1 batt) 3rd Slavonia District Grenzer Battalion CR2 Kaiser Hussars (4 sqdns)

    - General-Major Johann von Hiller:

IR21 Gemmingen (1 batt) IR12 Manfredini (2 batt) IR36 Kinsky (1 batt) IR37 De Vins (1 batt) IR51 Splenyi (1 batt)

    - General-Major Carnisius:

CR1 Kaiser Chevauleger (4 sqdns) CR19 Levenehr Chevauleger (5 sqdns)

  - Feldmarschall-Leutnant Anton Sztáray:
    - General-Major Prince Johann of Liechtenstein (Advance-Guard):

2nd Slavonia District Grenzer Battalion O'Donnel Freikorps (1 batt of 5 companies) Szeckler (Siebenburgen District) Grenzer Battalion Szeckler Grenzer Hussars (6 sqdns) CR37 Coburg Dragoons (1 sqdn) CR19 Levenehr Chevauleger (1 sqdn) CR5 Herzog Albert Carabinier (2 sqdns) CR7 Kinsky Chevaulegers (6 sqdns)

    - General-Major Montfraut:

IR54 Callenburg (1 batt) IR11 Wallis (1 batt) IR22 Lacy (1 batt)

    - General-Major Bartels:

Bavarian Palatinate Infantry (2 batt) (Imperial contingent)

    - General-Major Finke:

Le Loup Freikorps Battalion (6 companies) Archduke Charles Legion from Trier (2 companies) Rohan (Emigre) Infantry (1 batt)

    - General-Major Konrad Valentin von Kaim:

Szenossy Grenadier Battalion (IRs 19/37/53) Apfaltern Grenadier Battalion (IRs 33/39/52) Candiani Grenadier Battalion (IRs 31/51)

  - Feldmarschall-Leutnant Johann Sigismund Riesch
    - General-Major Prince Alexander of Württemberg:

CR20 Mack Kurassier (6 sqdns) CR37 Coburg Dragoons (5 sqdns

    - General-Major Spielberg:

Munster Dragoons 12 sqdns (Imperial contingent) CR2 Kaiser Hussars (4 sqdns)

  - Feldmarschall-Leutnant Paul Kray:
    - General-Major Friedrich Hohenlohe-Ingelfingen:

1st Slavonia Distrist Grenzer Battalion Croat-Slavonian Sharpshooters (4 companies) CR31 Latour Chevauleger (4 sqdns) CR35 Barco Hussars (4 sqdns) Uhlans (4 sqdns) Rohan (Emigre) Hussats (6 sqdns) Bussy Mounted Jager (4 sqdns)

    - General-Major Karl Joseph Hadik von Futak:

3rd Warasdin District Grenzer Battalion Wallachian (Siebenburgen District) Grenzer Battalion CR18 Karacsay Chevauleger (4 sqdns) CR16 Blankenstein Hussars (6 sqdns) CR34 Vecsey Hussars (4 sqdns)

    - General-Major Gorger:

1st Warasdin District Grenzer battalion Saxe (Emigre) Hussars (2 sqdns) Bercseny (Emigre) Hussars (2 sqdns) Royal Allemand (Emigre) Dragoons (2 sqdns)

    - General-Major Schottendorf:

IR33 Sztaray (2 batt)

    - General-Major Prince Friedrich of Orange:

IR1 Kaiser (1 batt) IR32 Gyulai (2 batt)

  - General-Major Staader:
    - General-Major Gontreuil:

IR9 Clertayf (1 batt) IR38 Wurtemberg (1 batt) IR58 Murray (1 batt) IR55 Beaulieu (1 batt)

  - Feldzeugmeister Wilhelm von Wartensleben (reserve)
    - General-Major Werneck:
      - General-Major Johann Kollowrat:

Ulm Grenadier Battalion (IRs 10/41/54) Frankenbusch Grenadier Battalion (IRs 25/35/42) Z'graidt Grenadier Battalion (IRs 9/30/56) Riera Grenadier Battalion (IRs 17/36/47)

      - General-Major Joseph von Schellenberg:

Bydeskuti Grenadier Battalion IRs 2/32/34) Reisinger Grenadier Battalion (IRs 1/12/40) Dietrich Grenadier Sattalian (IRs 7/20/56) Retz Grenadier Battation (IRs 15/28/57)

      - General-Major Ludwig von Vogelsang:

Gehnadegg Grenadier Battalion (IRs 13/26/43) Schreckinger Grenadier Battalion (IR 29) Paulus Grenadier Battalion (IRs 38/58) Kraissern Grenadier Battalion (IRs 16/27/45)

    - General-Major Colloredo:
      - General-Major Anhalt-Kothen

CR5 Herzog Albert Carabinier (6 sqdns) CR6 Kaiser Carabinier (6 sqdns)

    - General-Major Feldmarschall-Leutnant Karl of Lorraine-Lambesc:
      - General-Major Prince Franz Seraph of Rosenberg-Orsini

CR14 Nassau Kurassier (6 sqdns) CR10 Zeschwitz Kurassier (6 sqdns)

To the north of the battlefield:

  - General-Major Elsnitz:

4th Slavonia District Grenzer Battalion Wurmser Freikorps Battalion (6 companies) 2nd Warasdin District Grenzer Battalion Rohan (Emigre) Infantry (1 battalion) Carneville Freikorps Infantry (2 companies) Bourbon (emigre) Legion Battalion (4 companies) CR18 Karacsay Chevauleger (2 sqdns) CR31 Latour Chevauleger (2 sqdns) CR16 Blankenstein Hssars (4 sqdns) CR34 Vecsey Hussars (2 sqds) Carneville Freikorps Hussars (1 sqdn) Bourbon (Emigre) Hussars (4 sqdns) Uhlans (2 sqdns)

== See also ==
- Nafziger, George. "Austrian Army at Wurzbourg, 3 September 1796" (PDF). United States Army Combined Arms Center. Archived from the original (PDF) on 23 September 2015.

Preceded by Battle of Amberg	French Revolution: Revolutionary campaigns Battle of Würzburg	Succeeded by Battle of Rovereto
