= Peace of Leoben =

1797 armistice during the War of the First Coalition

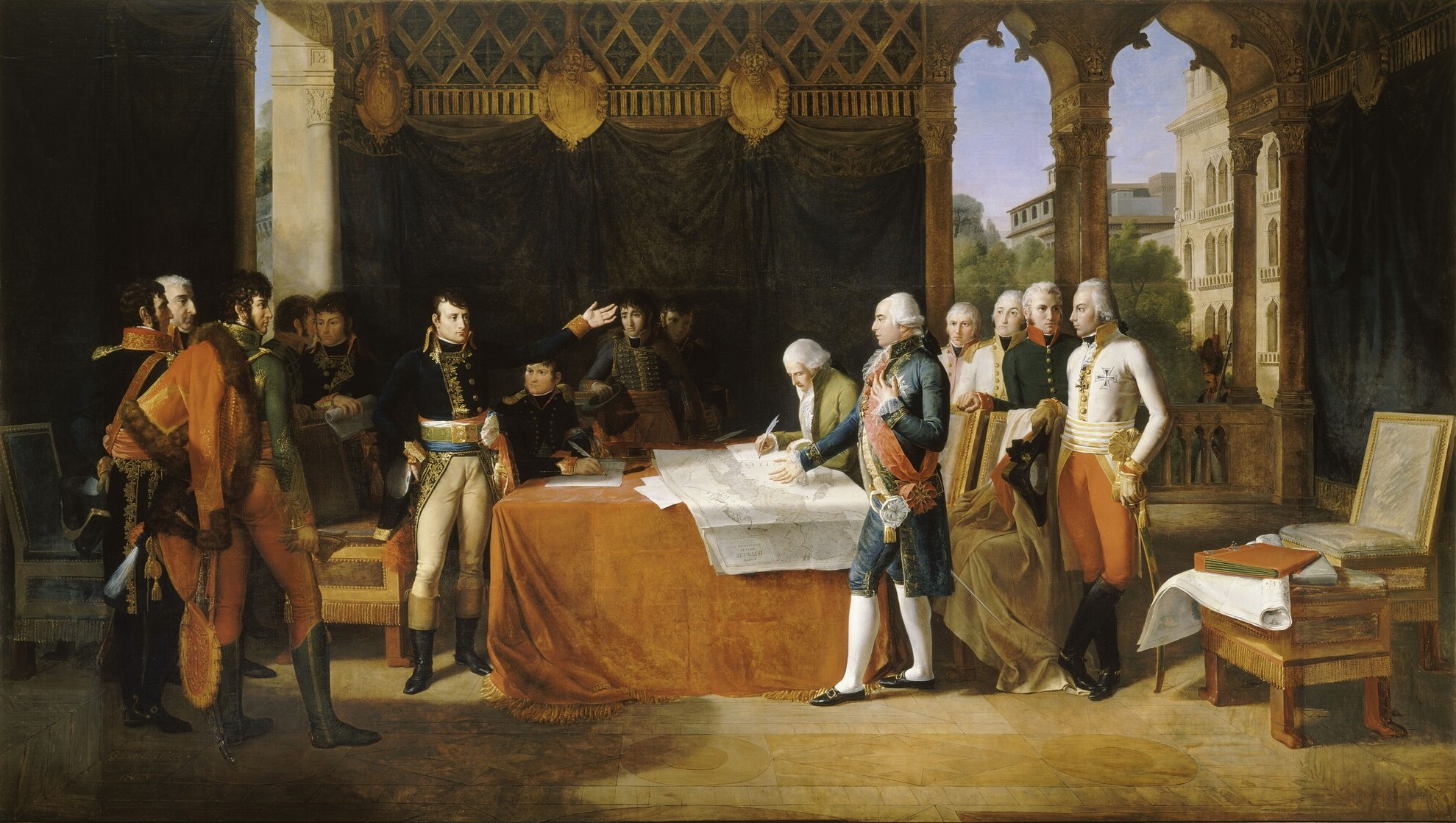
- A sketch of the signing, for a painting drawn in 1806 by Guillaume Guillon-Lethière. Now in the Palace of Versailles.
- Type: Armistice
- Signed: 18 April 1797
- Location: Leoben

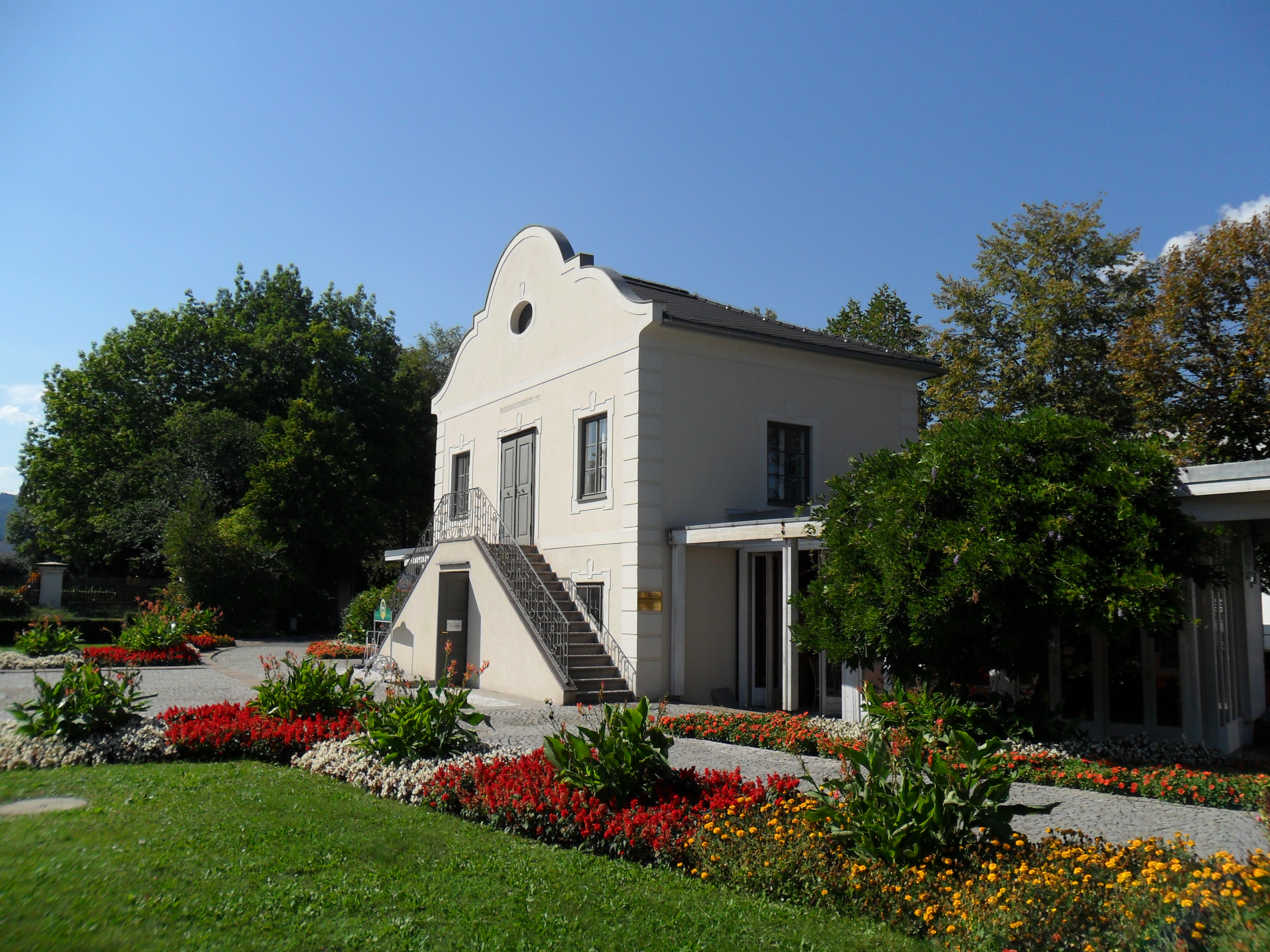
The garden house formerly owned by Josef von Eggenwald was the site of the signing

The Peace of Leoben (Note: Also called the Treaty of Leoben, the Preliminaries of Leoben, the Convention of Leoben, the Truce of Leoben or the Armistice of Leoben.) was a general armistice and preliminary peace agreement between the Holy Roman Empire and the French First Republic that ended the War of the First Coalition. It was signed at Eggenwaldsches Gartenhaus, near Leoben, on 18 April 1797 (29 germinal V in the French revolutionary calendar) by General Maximilian von Merveldt and the Marquis of Gallo on behalf of the Emperor Francis II and by General Napoleon Bonaparte on behalf of the French Directory. Ratifications were exchanged in Montebello on 24 May, and the treaty came into effect immediately.

On 30 March, Bonaparte had made his headquarters at Klagenfurt and from there, on 31 March, he sent a letter to the Austrian commander-in-chief, Archduke Charles, requesting an armistice to prevent the further loss of life. Receiving no response, the French advanced as far as Judenburg by the evening of 7 April. That night, Charles offered a truce for five days, which was accepted. On 13 April, Merveldt went to the French headquarters at Leoben. He requested the armistice be extended so that a preliminary peace could be signed, which was granted, and three proposals were drawn up. The final one was accepted by both sides, and on 18 April at Leoben, the preliminary peace was signed.

The treaty contained nine public articles and eleven secret ones. In the public articles, the Emperor ceded his "Belgian Provinces" (the Austrian Netherlands), and in the secret articles, he ceded his Italian states (Lombardy) in exchange for the Italian mainland possessions of the Republic of Venice, which had not yet been conquered. Except for these personal losses to the ruling Habsburgs, the treaty preserved the integrity of the Holy Roman Empire, unlike in the amplified Treaty of Campo Formio of 17 October 1797.

No final peace between the Holy Roman Empire and France was reached before the outbreak of the War of the Second Coalition in 1799.

== Sources ==
- Gagliardo, John G. (1980). Reich and Nation: The Holy Roman Empire as Idea and Reality, 1763–1806. University of Indiana Press.
- Kann, Robert A. (1974). A History of the Habsburg Empire, 1526–1918. University of California Press. ISBN 978-0-520-02408-3.
- Rose, John Holland (1904). "Bonaparte and the Conquest of Italy". In Ward, A. W.; Prothero, G. W.; Leathes, Stanley (eds.). The Cambridge Modern History, Volume VIII: The French Revolution. Cambridge University Press. pp. 553–93.
- Whaley, Joachim (2012). Germany and the Holy Roman Empire, Volume II: The Peace of Westphalia to the Dissolution of the Reich, 1648–1806. Oxford University Press.

Preceded by Action of 25 January 1797	French Revolution: Revolutionary campaigns Peace of Leoben	Succeeded by Battle of Neuwied (1797)
