= Battle of Neuwied (1797) =

1797 battle of the War of the First Coalition

- Part of the War of the First Coalition
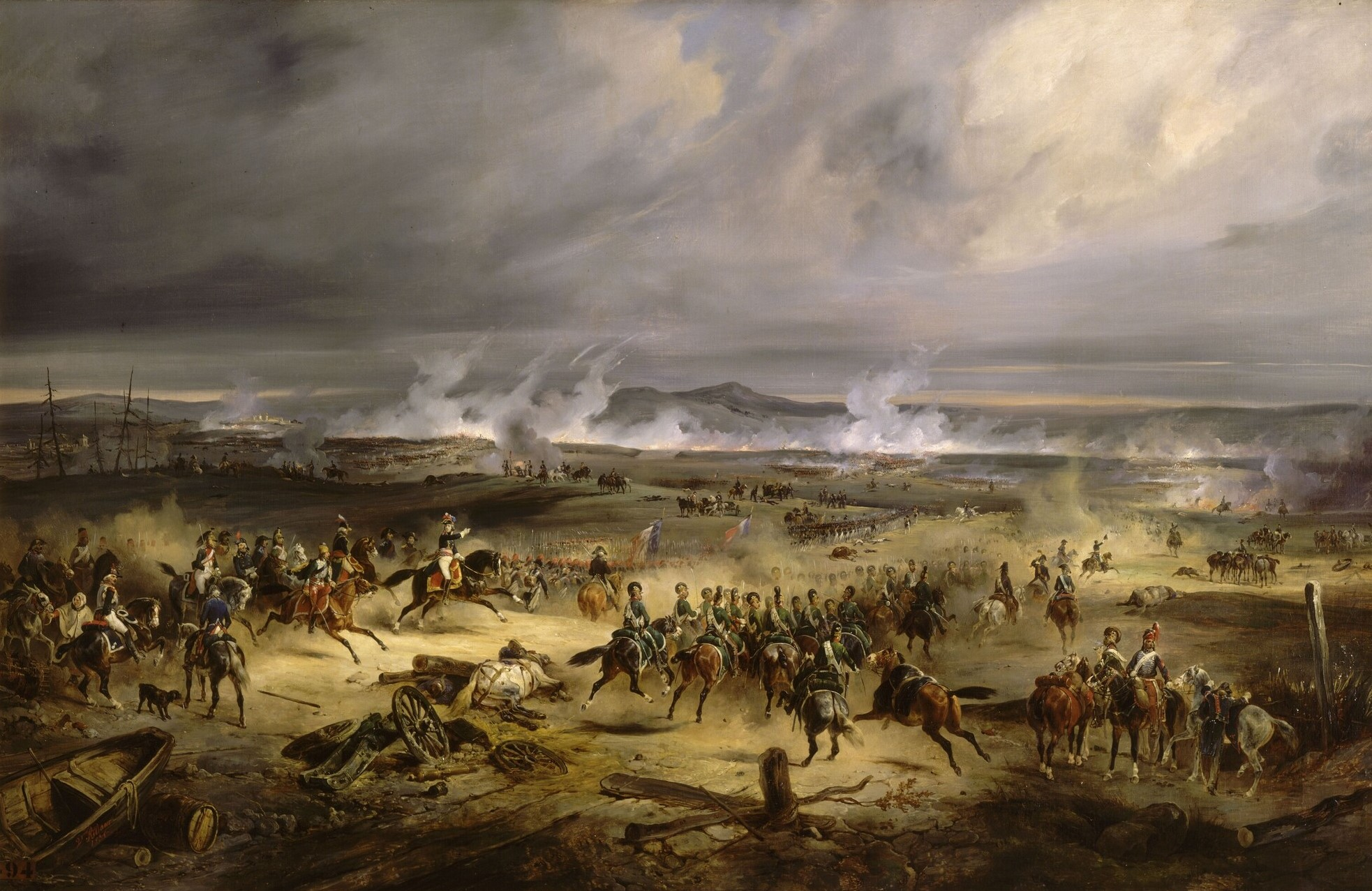
- 1836 painting of the battle
Date	18 April 1797
Location	Neuwied, Wied-Neuwied 50°27′12″N 7°27′15″E
Result	French victory

Belligerents
France	Austria

Commanders and leaders
Lazare Hoche	Franz von Werneck

Units involved
Army of Sambre and Meuse	Army of the Lower Rhine

Strength
35,000 to 38,000	21,000

Casualties and losses
2,000 killed, wounded or captured	3,000–4,000 killed or wounded; 7,000 captured
- Location within Europe

The Battle of Neuwied was fought on 18 April 1797 near Neuwied as part of the War of the First Coalition. 35,000–38,000 French troops from the Army of Sambre and Meuse under Divisional-general Lazare Hoche attacked 21,000 Austrian troops under Major-general Franz von Werneck. Hoche's troops surprised the Austrians and broke through their lines, inflicting heavy casualties on von Werneck's army before driving it from the field. The French suffered only 2,000 killed, wounded or captured while the Austrians suffered between 3,000 and 4,000 killed or wounded and a further 7,000 captured. Von Werneck's army also lost 24 guns, 60 wagons and seven regimental colours. Further fighting was halted by news of Divisional-general Napoleon Bonaparte's signing of the Peace of Leoben with Austria on the same day the battle was fought.

== Battle ==
The battle opened with an Austrian cannonade causing an attack by the French right wing on the Austrian left wing under Pál Kray. After several attacks against the key position on the Austrian right near the village of Bendorff, the French infantry, aided by several squadrons of chasseurs, were able to dislodge the Austrians from this position. A French cavalry charge drove the Austrians out of the village of Sayn. Hoche then launched a column under Antoine Richepanse in the pursuit of the retreating Austrians. Richepanse succeeded in capturing seven cannons, fifty caissons and five Austrian colors. The French infantry, supported by the guns of François Joseph Lefebvre, managed to dislodge the Austrians from the village of Zolenberg, causing the final defeat of the Austrian left wing.

As the French right wing attacked the Austrian left wing, Hoche launched a second assault, this time on the Austrian center. After an artillery barrage, the grenadiers of General Paul Grenier assaulted the redoubts of Hettersdorff and took the village in a bayonet charge, while the hussars of Michel Ney outflanked the Austrian center position from the left. These attacks forced the Austrian center to retreat.

After being dislodged by Richepanse, the Austrian left was rallied by Kray who was able to withstand further French attacks. To counter this, Hoche launched the grenadiers of Grenier and several squadrons of dragoons and Ney's hussars against Kray. Ney with some 500 hussars proceeded to Dierdorf where he engaged the Austrian reserve of 6,000 for four hours until the rest of the French army caught up. During a counterattack by Austrian cavalry Ney's horse fell and he was captured. Under this attack the Austrian left collapsed and in the pursuit the hussars captured 4,000 men and two colors. On their part of the battlefield the French left wing under Jean Étienne Championnet succeeded in driving the Austrians out of Altenkirchen and Kerathh.

== Aftermath ==
The Austrian army lost 3,000 to 4,000 killed or wounded and another 7,000 captured during the battle. The French captured 27 cannon and seven colors in this major success. Hoche's successful offensive was stopped by news of the Peace of Leoben which led to the Treaty of Campo Formio. The Battle of Neuwied is inscribed on the Arc de Triomphe in Paris.

Preceded by Treaty of Leoben	French Revolution: Revolutionary campaigns Battle of Neuwied (1797)	Succeeded by Treaty of Campo Formio
