= Action of 25 January 1797 =

1797 naval battle during the War of the First Coalition

- Part of the Anglo-Spanish War (1796–1808) during the War of the First Coalition
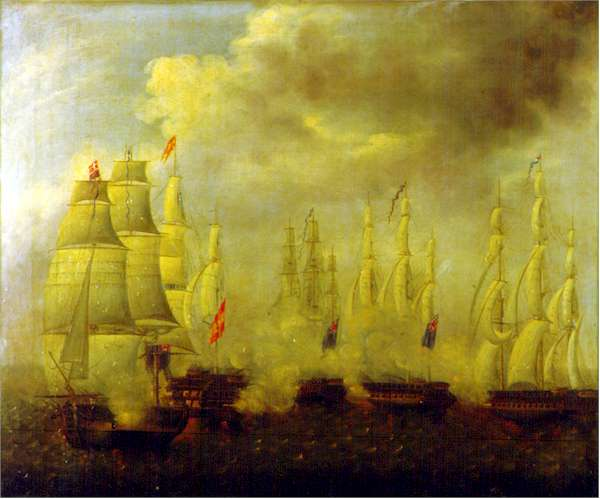
- Battle between San Francisco de Asís and three British frigates and a corvette – oil on canvas, Naval Museum of Madrid
| Date | 25 January 1797 |
| Location | Gulf of Cádiz, Spain 36°50′N 7°10′W |
| Result | Spanish victory |

Belligerents
| Great Britain | Spain |

Commanders and leaders
| (Kingdom of Great Britain) George Stewart | (Spain) Alonso de Torres y Guerra |

Strength
| 3 fifth-rate frigates, 1 sixth-rate sloop | 1 third-rate ship of line |

Casualties and losses
| Unknown | 2 killed 12 wounded |
- Location within Europe

The action of 25 January 1797 was a minor naval battle of the French Revolutionary Wars, fought in the Gulf of Cádiz. The Spanish third-rate ship of the line San Francisco de Asís was attacked and pursued for several hours by a British squadron of three fifth-rates frigates and a sixth-rate corvette under George Stewart, 8th Earl of Galloway. After an intermittent but fierce exchange of fire, the British warships, badly damaged, were eventually forced to withdraw. The San Francisco de Asís, which suffered only minor damage, was able to return to Cádiz without difficulties. The commander of the ship, Captain Alonso de Torres y Guerra, was promoted for his success.

== Background ==
The winter of 1796–1797 was one of the stormiest of the 18th century. The British Royal Navy lost the ships of line HMS Courageux, wrecked off Gibraltar, and HMS Bombay Castle, foundered in the shoals of the Tagus river's mouth, as well as two frigates. A French expedition sent to Ireland to assist the rebel United Irishmen against the British government failed due to the storms. The Spanish navy also suffered the effects of the winter. The third-rate ship of the line San Francisco de Asís, commanded by Captain Don Alonso de Torres y Guerra, which was anchored in the Bay of Cádiz during a mission to protect the arrival of Spanish commercial shipping from America, was hit by the storms, and having lost her anchor, she was forced to go out to open sea.

Spain and Britain, which had been allies against the Revolutionary France until the Peace of Basel and had cooperated in the Siege of Toulon (1793), became enemies when Spain aligned itself with France by Second Treaty of San Ildefonso in 1796. The British navy, on the outbreak of the war, withdrew from the Mediterranean Sea and was stationed in the Iberian Atlantic coast, from Cape Finisterre to Gibraltar. Sir John Jervis, commander of the Mediterranean Fleet, took its base at Lisbon, having been ordered by the Admiralty to focus on "taking every opportunity of annoying the enemy", asides of protecting the British trade and cutting Spain from its colonies. Among the British ships based in Lisbon, there was a division under the Earl of Galloway which comprised the frigates Lively, Niger and Meleager, and the sloops Fortune and Raven. According to Sir John Barrow, 1st Baronet, Second Secretary to the Admiralty for 40 years, Galloway, later known as Lord Garlies, was "an excellent man, but of a warm and sanguine temperament".

== Battle ==
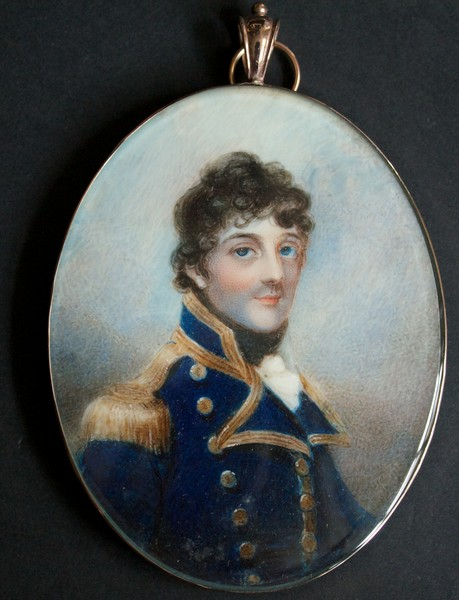
George Stewart as a post-captain – watercolour on ivory by Anne Mee

At dawn on 25 January, the three frigates and one sloop of Galloway's division were sighted from the San Francisco de Asís sailing north-eastwards at a distance of 11 leagues from the port of Cádiz, parallel to the city. The lack of response to the signals of recognition made from the Spanish ship put on alert its crew. The British ships began to come close to the San Francisco de Asís relying on their lightness and their advantage, both in number and in artillery, as the division's ships mounted 40 pieces each of the two heaviest frigates, 34 the lesser one, and 28 the sloop. Minerve and Meleager were armed, moreover, with 24-pounder carronades.

At 1 pm the British division had approached enough to open fire on the San Francisco, who had hoisted its flag, ready to engage Galloway's ships, which also hoisted their British flags. The San Francisco then opened fire, and a running battle ensued without intermission until 4 pm. In the process, the San Francisco received the fire of two British frigates which successively shot him with grapeshot. The Spanish ship could only return the fire with the stern chasers of its batteries, although she luffed occasionally to shoot broadsides on the British frigates, inflicting serious damage. The British gunners, noted for their skill through the war, were not particularly accurate during the action, and San Francisco, already hit by the storm, didn't suffer serious damage.

The British frigates left the battle at 4 pm, and although after consulting among themselves the British commanders resolved return to fight at 4:30 pm, they finally withdrew half an hour later. The imminence of the nightfall and the possibility of running aground on the coast between Huelva and Ayamonte convinced Alonso de Torres y Guerra to turn back to Cádiz instead of chasing Galloway's division, but trying before to sail between the retreating British ships to shoot upon them two complete broadsides. The British vessels, however, managed to avoid the action by taking advantage of its fasteness and the darkness of the dusk.

== Aftermath ==
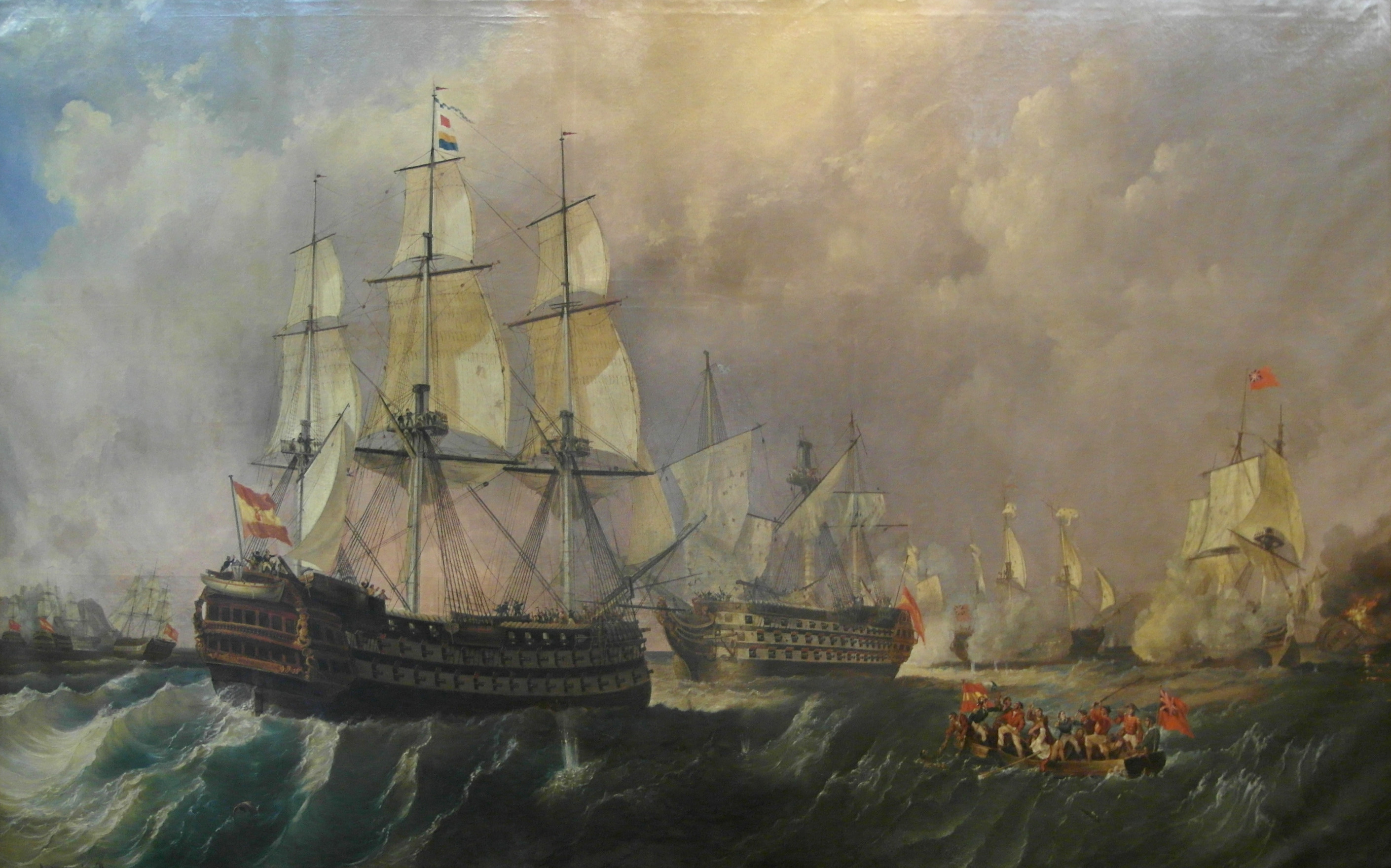
Rescue of the Santísima Trinidad at the Battle of Cape St Vincent, by Antonio de Brugada Vila (1804–1863)

The San Francisco de Asís had 2 men killed and 12 wounded in the action. She received a shot at the mainyard, another one awash, and minor damage to the rigging and the hull. The ship had been repaired when, on 14 February, it took part in the Battle of Cape St Vincent. The British fleet, commanded by John Jervis, was victorious over the Spanish fleet under José de Córdoba y Ramos. The San Francisco played a role in the battle, helping at the end of the action to relieve the three-decker Santísima Trinidad, which had been put out of action and was about to be taken by the British fleet. The damage and casualties aboard the British division remain unknown, and the action is not mentioned in English sources, though the Spanish naval historian Cesáreo Fernández Duro states that one of Galloway's frigates lost its foretopmast.

A success by ship of line fighting alone against a squadron of well armed frigates was not common during the French Revolutionary and Napoleonic Wars. For example, in the action of 8 March 1795, the 74-gun HMS Berwick was captured in just 15 minutes by the French frigate Alceste, supported by the frigates Minerve and Vestale. As a reward for his victory, Captain Alonso de Torres y Guerra was given the encomienda of Corral de Caracuel in the Order of Alcántara, which included, asides of the title of knight, an income of 15.800 reales. On the other hand, Galloway's career wasn't damaged by the result of the action, and he was chosen by Admiral Jervis to carry back to England news of the victory of St Vincent.

== Notes ==
| Preceded by Battle of Rivoli | French Revolution: Revolutionary campaigns Action of 25 January 1797 | Succeeded by Treaty of Leoben |
